= Rudolph Bentinck =

Royal Navy Admiral (1869–1947)

Admiral Sir Rudolph Bentinck KCB KCMG
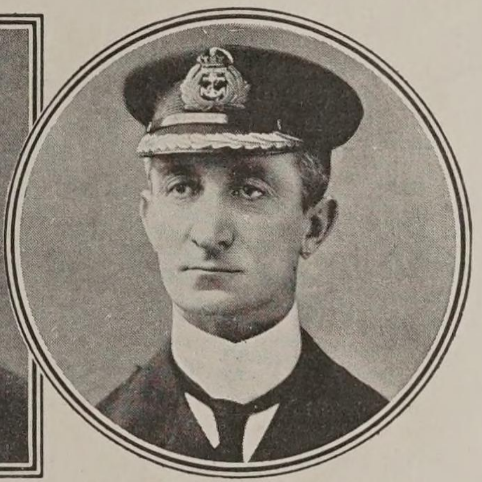
- Bentinck as a captain
- Born: 20 March 1869; Littlegreenhouse, Sussex
- Died: 31 March 1947 (aged 78); Basingstoke, Hampshire
- Military career
- Allegiance: United Kingdom
- Branch: Royal Navy
- Service years: 1882–1929
- Rank: Admiral
- Commands: Plymouth Command (1926–29); Reserve Fleet (1926); Africa Station (1922–24); 4th Light Cruiser Squadron (1917–18); HMS Calliope (1917–18); HMS Tiger (1916–17); HMS Superb (1914–15); Royal Naval College, Osborne (1913–14); HMS Bristol (1910–13); HMS Prometheus (1906–08)
- Conflicts: Mahdist War; First World War
- Awards: Knight Commander of the Order of the Bath; Knight Commander of the Order of St Michael and St George; Mentioned in Despatches

Admiral Sir Rudolph Walter Bentinck, KCB, KCMG (20 March 1869 – 31 March 1947) was a Royal Navy officer who served as Commander-in-Chief, Plymouth from 1926 to 1929.

== Early life ==
Rudolph was the second son of Walter Theodore Edward Bentinck, 13th Baron Bentinck (1840–1901), of a distinguished Dutch family, by his wife Henrietta Jane Christina (d. 1924), daughter of William Hinton, of The Til, Madeira, Portugal.

== Naval career ==
Educated at the Royal Naval College, Dartmouth, Bentinck joined the Royal Navy in 1882. He took part in the Mahdist War in 1891, and was promoted to commander on 31 December 1901. He was appointed Commander of the Royal Naval College, Osborne, in 1913.

Bentinck served in the First World War, taking part in the Battle of Jutland in 1916, as Chief of Staff to Admiral Sir David Beatty, and being mentioned in despatches. After the war he became Naval Secretary. He was appointed second-in-command of the 1st Battle Squadron in the Atlantic Fleet in 1921 and went on to be Commander-in-Chief of the Africa Station in 1922. In that capacity he was briefly acting Governor-General of South Africa from December 1923 to January 1924.

Bentinck became Admiral Commanding the Reserve Fleet in March 1926 and then Commander-in-Chief, Plymouth later that year: he retired in 1929.

Bentinck was appointed a Knight Commander of the Order of St Michael and St George (KCMG) in the 1919 Birthday Honours, and a Knight Commander of the Order of the Bath (KCB) in the 1926 Birthday Honours.

== Family ==
In 1898 Bentinck married Mabel Fetherstonhaugh; they had one son and one daughter. A descendant is the entrepreneur Alice Bentinck.

Military offices
Preceded by Allan Everett	Naval Secretary; 1918–1921	Succeeded by Hugh Watson
Preceded by Sir William Goodenough	Commander-in-Chief, Africa Station; 1922–1924	Succeeded by Sir Maurice Fitzmaurice
Preceded by Sir Victor Stanley	Commander-in-Chief, Reserve Fleet; March–October 1926	Succeeded by Sir Hugh Watson
Preceded by Sir Richard Phillimore	Commander-in-Chief, Plymouth; 1926–1929	Succeeded by Sir Hubert Brand
