= 4th Battle Squadron =

Former battleship formation of the Royal Navy

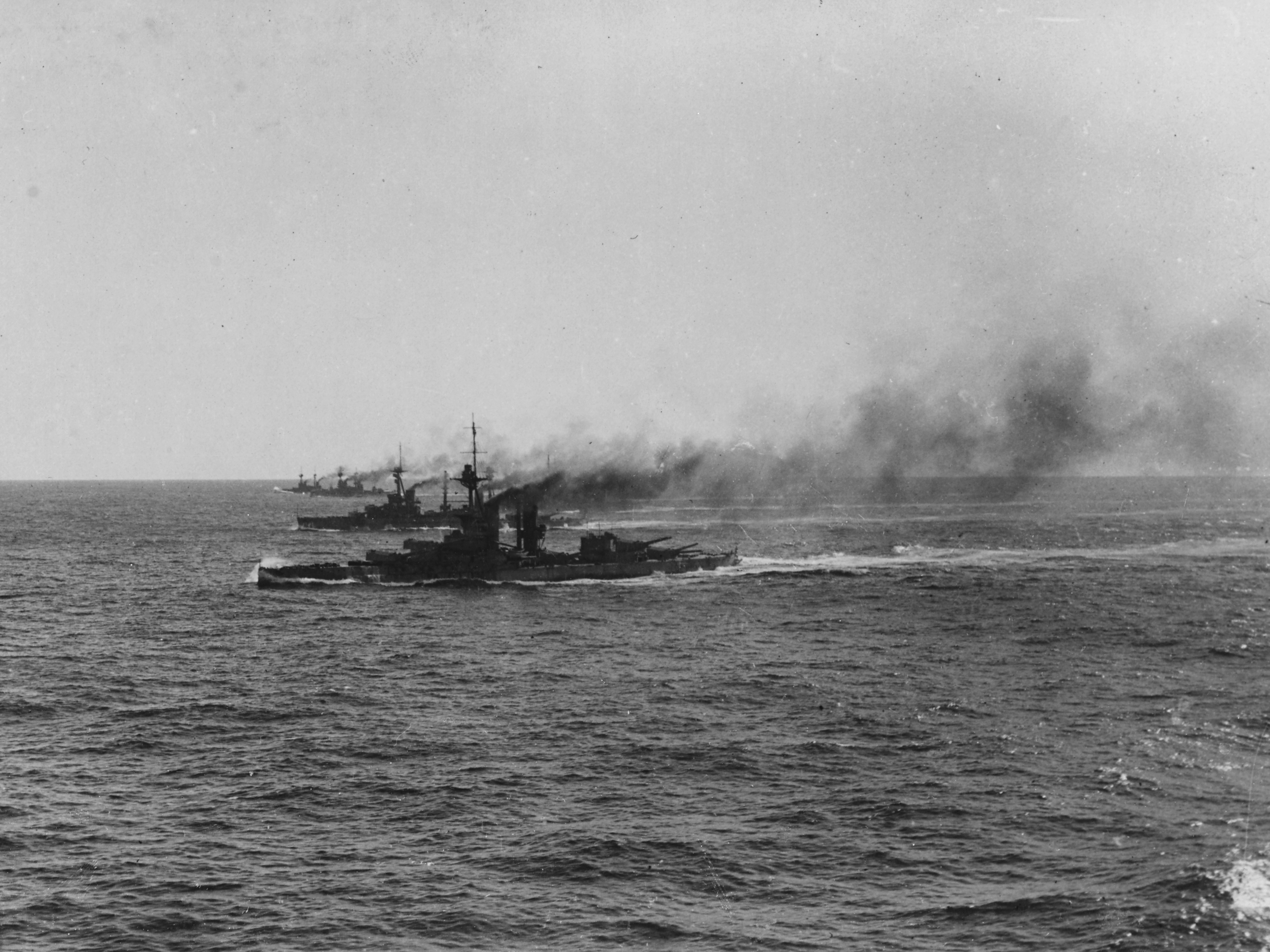
- The ships of the 4th Battle Squadron, Benbow, Agincourt, Bellerophon, and Temeraire steaming in the North Sea, 1915.
- Active: 1912–30 March 1919; reformed
- Country: United Kingdom
- Branch: Royal Navy
- Size: Squadron
- Part of: Home Fleet; Grand Fleet

The 4th Battle Squadron was a squadron of the British Royal Navy consisting of battleships. The 4th Battle Squadron was initially part of the Royal Navy's Home Fleet (1912–14) and then the Grand Fleet after the outbreak of the First World War. The squadron changed composition often as ships were damaged, retired or transferred.

== August 1914 ==
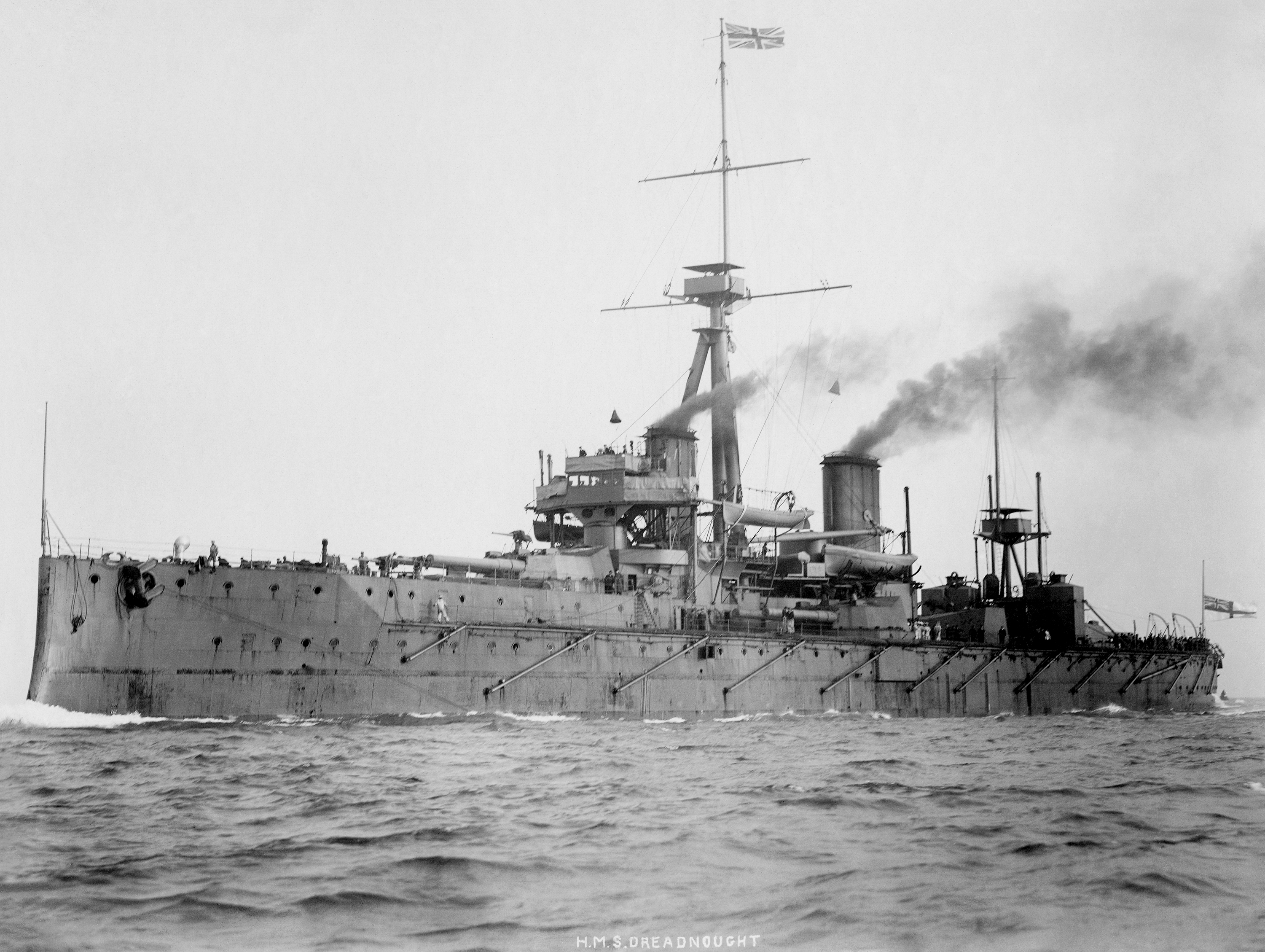
HMS Dreadnought

On 5 August 1914, the squadron was constituted as follows:

- HMS Agincourt
- HMS Bellerophon
- HMS Dreadnought
- HMS Temeraire

== January 1915 ==
By January 1915, the composition had changed slightly:

- HMS Agincourt
- HMS Bellerophon
- HMS Dreadnought
- HMS Temeraire
- HMS Benbow
- HMS Emperor of India
- HMS Erin

== Battle of Jutland, June 1916 ==
As an element in the Grand Fleet, the squadron participated in the Battle of Jutland. During the battle, the composition of the 4th Battle Squadron was as follows:

- Third Division
  - HMS Iron Duke, fleet flagship of Admiral Sir John Jellicoe; Captain Frederic Dreyer;
  - HMS Royal Oak, Captain Crawford Maclachlan;
  - HMS Superb, flagship of Rear Admiral A. L. Duff; Captain E. Hyde-Parker;
  - HMS Canada, Captain W. C. M. Nicholson;
- Fourth Division
  - HMS Benbow, flagship of Vice Admiral Sir Doveton Sturdee; Captain H. W. Parker;
  - HMS Bellerophon, Captain E. F. Bruen;
  - HMS Temeraire, Captain E. V. Underhill;
  - HMS Vanguard, Captain J. D. Dick;

== January 1917 ==
Following the Battle of Jutland, the 4th Battle Squadron was reorganized, with Colossus, Hercules, St. Vincent, Collingwood and Neptune all transferred from the 1st Battle Squadron. In January 1917, the squadron was constituted as follows:

- HMS Bellerophon
- HMS Temeraire
- HMS Vanguard
- HMS Superb
- HMS Colossus
- HMS Hercules
- HMS Neptune
- HMS St. Vincent
- HMS Collingwood

After the loss of HMS Vanguard in July 1917, HMS Superb and HMS Temeraire were detached to the Mediterranean in 1918. HMS Dreadnought rejoined the squadron as flagship in March 1918.

== Postwar ==
The squadron was dispersed in February 1919, appears to have been formally dissolved in March 1919, but then reformed.

In September 1920 Rear Admiral Richard Webb was posted to the Mediterranean as Rear-Admiral 4th Battle Squadron and Second-in-Command, Mediterranean Fleet. He served there until 1922.

== Admirals commanding ==
Post holders as follows:

	Rank	Flag	Name	Term	Notes
Admirals, Commanding, 4th Battle Squadron
1	Vice-Admiral	Vice-Admiral - Royal Navy	Sir Sir Charles Briggs	1 July 1912 – 1 July 1914	
2	Vice-Admiral	Vice-Admiral - Royal Navy	Sir Douglas Gamble	1 July 1914 – 7 February 1915	
3	Admiral	Admiral - Royal Navy	Sir F. C. Doveton Sturdee	7 February 1915 – 13 February 1918	
4	Vice-Admiral	Vice-Admiral - Royal Navy	Sir Montague Browning	13 February 1918 – 3 December 1918	
5	Rear-Admiral	Rear-Admiral - Royal Navy	Douglas R. L. Nicholson	3 December 1918 – 1 February 1919	temporary command
6	Vice-Admiral	Vice-Admiral - Royal Navy	Sir Montague Browning	1 February 1919 – 1924	

== Rear-Admirals, Second-in-Command ==
Post holders as follows:

	Rank	Flag	Name	Term	Notes
Rear-Admiral, in the 4th Battle Squadron
1	Rear-Admiral	Rear-Admiral - Royal Navy	Alexander Duff	22 October 1914 – 12 June 1916	
2	Rear-Admiral	Rear-Admiral - Royal Navy	Ernest F. A. Gaunt	12 June 1916 – 23 June 1917	
3	Rear-Admiral	Rear-Admiral - Royal Navy	Roger J.B. Keyes	23 June 1917 – 25 September 1917	
4	Rear-Admiral	Rear-Admiral - Royal Navy	Douglas R. L. Nicholson	22 September 1917 – 3 December 1918	acting squadron commander
5	Rear-Admiral	Rear-Admiral - Royal Navy	Michael Culme-Seymour	1 January 1919 – 1 September 1920	
6	Rear-Admiral	Rear-Admiral - Royal Navy	Richard Webb	1 September 1920 – 27 July 1922	
7	Rear-Admiral	Rear-Admiral - Royal Navy	John D. Kelly	27 July 1922 – June 1923	
8	Rear-Admiral	Rear-Admiral - Royal Navy	Hugh D. Watson	26 June 1923 – October 1924	
