= Edwin Underhill =

Edwin Underhill may refer to:

- Edwin S. Underhill (1861–1929), U.S. representative from New York
- Edwin Veale Underhill (1868–1928), Royal Navy officer
