= Hugh Watson =

Royal Navy Admiral and Naval Secretary (1872–1954)

Admiral Sir Hugh Watson KCB CVO CBE
- Portrait by Walter Stoneman, 1928
- Born: Hugh Dudley Richards Watson; 20 April 1872; Saltfleetby, Lincolnshire, England
- Died: 22 May 1954 (aged 82); Windsor, Berkshire, England
- Military career
- Allegiance: United Kingdom
- Branch: Royal Navy
- Service years: 1885–1928
- Rank: Admiral
- Commands: HMS Essex; HMS Bellerophon; HMS Canada
- Conflicts: World War I
- Awards: Knight Commander of the Order of the Bath; Commander of the Royal Victorian Order; Commander of the Order of the British Empire

Admiral Sir Hugh Dudley Richards Watson KCB CVO CBE (20 April 1872 – 22 May 1954) was a Royal Navy officer who became Naval Secretary.

== Naval career ==
Watson joined the Royal Navy in 1885. From 6 May 1902 he served as 1st Lieutenant on the armoured cruiser HMS Sutlej, soon to be commissioned for service on the China station. He was promoted to the rank of commander on 1 January 1903, and later appointed Commander of the School of Physical Training before becoming Naval Attaché in Berlin in 1910 and then serving in World War I as Captain of the cruiser HMS Essex from 1914, the battleship HMS Bellerophon from 1915, and the battleship HMS Canada from 1918.

He played one first-class cricket match for the Marylebone Cricket Club in 1908.

After the War, he served with the Allied Post War Control Commission and then became Naval Secretary in 1921 before becoming Commander of the 4th Battle Squadron (renumbered the 3rd Battle Squadron in November 1924) and Second-in-Command of the Mediterranean Fleet in August 1923. His last appointment was as Admiral commanding the Reserve Fleet in 1926 before he retired in 1928.

Military offices
Preceded by Rudolph Bentinck	Naval Secretary; 1921–1923	Succeeded by Michael Hodges
Preceded by Sir Rudolph Bentinck	Commander-in-Chief, Reserve Fleet; 1926–1928	Succeeded by Sir William Boyle
