= HMS Temeraire (1907) =

Bellerophon-class British dreadnought

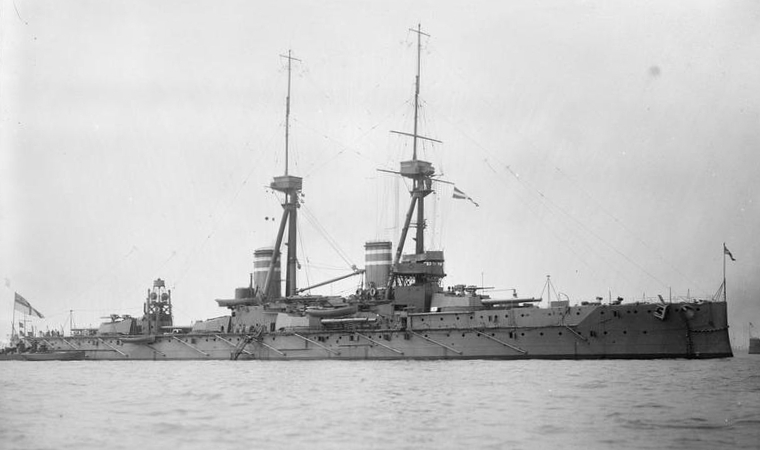
- Temeraire at anchor, 1909

History

United Kingdom
- Name: Temeraire
- Namesake: A captured French ship of the line
- Ordered: 30 October 1906
- Builder: HM Dockyard, Devonport
- Laid down: 1 January 1907
- Launched: 24 August 1907
- Completed: May 1909
- Commissioned: 15 May 1909
- Decommissioned: 1921
- Fate: Sold for scrap, 7 December 1921

General characteristics (as built)
- Class & type: Bellerophon-class dreadnought battleship
- Displacement: 18,596 long tons (18,894 t) (normal)
- Length: 526 ft (160.3 m) (o/a)
- Beam: 82 ft 6 in (25.1 m)
- Draught: 27 ft (8.2 m)
- Installed power: 23,000 shp (17,000 kW); 18 × Yarrow boilers
- Propulsion: 4 × shafts; 2 × steam turbine sets
- Speed: 21 knots (39 km/h; 24 mph)
- Range: 5,720 nmi (10,590 km; 6,580 mi) at 10 knots (19 km/h; 12 mph)
- Complement: 681–729
- Armament: 5 × twin 12 in (305 mm) guns; 16 × single 4 in (102 mm) guns; 3 × 18 in (450 mm) torpedo tubes
- Armour: Belt: 10 in (254 mm); Deck: 0.75–4 in (19–102 mm); Turrets: 11 in (279 mm); Barbettes: 9–10 in (229–254 mm)

HMS Temeraire was one of three Bellerophon-class dreadnought battleships built for the Royal Navy in the first decade of the 20th century. She spent almost her whole career assigned to the Home and Grand Fleets. Aside from participating in the Battle of Jutland in May 1916 and the inconclusive action of 19 August, her service during World War I generally consisted of routine patrols and training in the North Sea.

Temeraire was transferred to the Mediterranean Fleet in October 1918 and she supported Allied forces in the Mediterranean and the Black Sea after the war ended in November. The ship was deemed obsolete and was reduced to reserve when she returned home in early 1919 and was then used as a training ship. Temeraire was sold for scrap in 1921 and broken up the following year.

== Design and description ==
The design of the Bellerophon class was derived from that of the revolutionary (Note: Dreadnought was the first battleship with a homogenous main armament, and was the most powerful and fastest battleship in the world at the time of her completion. She made all other battleships obsolete and gave her name to all the subsequent battleships of her type.) battleship HMS Dreadnought, with a slight increase in size, armour and a more powerful secondary armament. Temeraire had an overall length of 526 feet (160.3 m), a beam of 82 feet 6 inches (25.1 m), and a normal draught of 27 feet (8.2 m). She displaced 18,596 long tons (18,894 t) at normal load and 22,359 long tons (22,718 t) at deep load. In 1909 her crew numbered 681 officers and ratings and 729 in 1911.

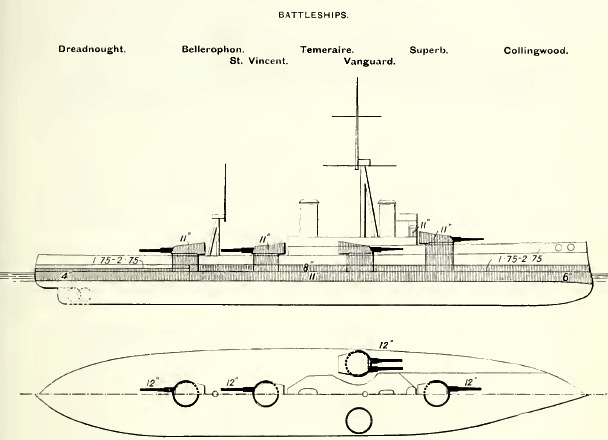
Right elevation and plan of the first generation of British dreadnoughts from Brassey's Naval Annual, 1912

The Bellerophons were powered by two sets of Parsons direct-drive steam turbines, each driving two shafts, using steam from eighteen Yarrow boilers. The turbines were rated at a total of 23,000 shaft horsepower (17,000 kW) and were intended to give them a maximum speed of 21 knots (39 km/h; 24 mph). During Temeraire's sea trials on 5 March 1909, she reached a top speed of 21.55 knots (39.91 km/h; 24.80 mph) from 26,966 shp (20,109 kW). The ship carried enough coal and fuel oil to give her a range of 5,720 nautical miles (10,590 km; 6,580 mi) at a cruising speed of 10 knots (19 km/h; 12 mph).

=== Armament and armour ===
The Bellerophon class was equipped with ten breech-loading (BL) 12-inch (305 mm) Mk X guns in five twin-gun turrets, three along the centreline and the remaining two as wing turrets. The centreline turrets were designated 'A', 'X' and 'Y', from front to rear, and the port and starboard wing turrets were 'P' and 'Q', respectively. The secondary, or anti-torpedo boat armament, comprised 16 BL 4-inch (102 mm) Mk VII guns in single mounts. Two of these guns were each installed on the roofs of the fore and aft centreline turrets and the wing turrets in unshielded mounts, and the other eight were positioned in the superstructure. (Note: Sources disagree on the type and composition of the secondary armament. Burt claims that they were the older quick-firing QF Mark III guns. Neither book by Preston identify the types, but do call them quick-firers. Parkes also does not identify the type, but he does say that they were 50-calibre guns and Preston agrees. Friedman shows the QF Mark III as a 40-calibre gun and states that the 50-calibre BL Mark VII gun armed all of the early dreadnoughts.) The ships were also fitted with three 18-inch (450 mm) torpedo tubes, one on each broadside and the third in the stern.

The Bellerophon-class ships had a waterline belt of Krupp cemented armour that was 10 inches (254 mm) thick between the fore and aftmost barbettes. The three armoured decks ranged in thicknesses from 0.75 to 4 inches (19 to 102 mm). The main battery turret faces were 11 inches (279 mm) thick, and the turrets were supported by 9–10 inches (229–254 mm) thick barbettes.

==== Modifications ====
The four-inch guns on the forward turret roof were transferred to the superstructure in 1914 and the guns from the wing turrets were remounted in the aft superstructure in 1914–1915; all of the four-inch guns in the superstructure were enclosed to better protect their crews. In addition, a single three-inch (76 mm) anti-aircraft (AA) gun was added on the former searchlight platform between the aft turrets. Shortly afterwards, the guns on the aft turret were removed as were one pair from the superstructure. Around the same time another three-inch AA gun was added to the aft turret roof.

By May 1916, a fire-control director had been installed high on the forward tripod mast and approximately 23 long tons (23 t) of additional deck armour was added after the Battle of Jutland. By April 1917, Temeraire had exchanged the three-inch AA gun on 'Y' turret for a four-inch gun and the stern torpedo tube had been removed. In 1918 a high-angle rangefinder was fitted and the four-inch AA gun was moved to the quarterdeck. After the war ended, four secondary guns were removed to provide extra space for naval cadets and both AA guns were dismounted.

== Construction and career ==
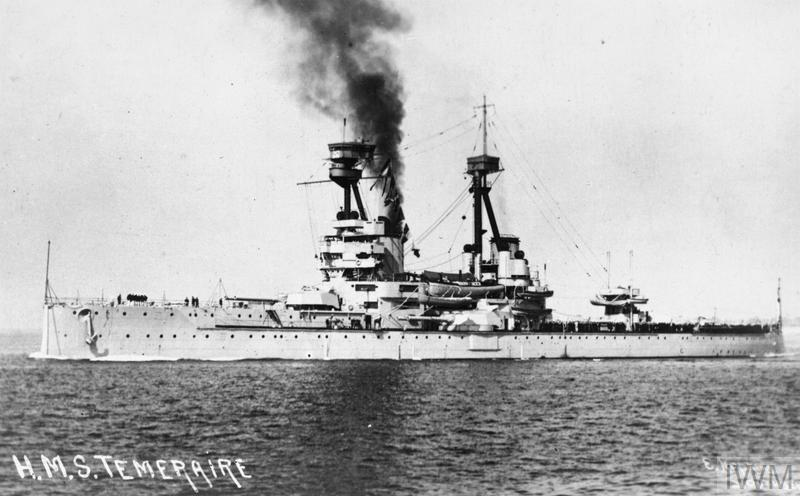
Temeraire

Temeraire was named after the French 74-gun ship of the line Téméraire that had been captured in 1759, and was the fourth ship of her name to serve in the Royal Navy. The ship was ordered on 30 October 1906 and was laid down at HM Dockyard, Devonport on 1 January 1907. She was launched on 24 August 1907 and completed in May 1909. Including her armament, her cost is variously quoted at £1,744,287 or £1,751,144. On 31 July 1909 Temeraire was taking part in a Royal Review of the Fleet at Spithead when an accident with a 4-inch gun injured three men, one of whom later died. Temeraire was commissioned on 15 May 1909 and assigned to the 1st Division of the Home Fleet under the command of Captain Alexander Duff. She participated in combined fleet manoeuvres in June–July and was then reviewed by King Edward VII and Tsar Nicholas II of Russia during Cowes Week on 31 July. Captain Arthur Christian relieved Duff on 25 October. Temeraire was refitted in 1911 at Devonport and then took part in the Coronation Fleet Review for King George V at Spithead on 24 June 1911. Christian was relieved in his turn by Captain Reginald Allenby on 12 August. The 1st Division was renamed the 1st Battle Squadron (BS) on 1 May 1912. The ship was present in the Parliamentary Naval Review on 9 July at Spithead and then participated in manoeuvres in October. On 5 April 1913 Captain Cresswell Eyres assumed command of the ship. The squadron visited Cherbourg, France in July. Eyres was relieved by Captain Edwyn Alexander-Sinclair on 1 September.

=== First World War ===
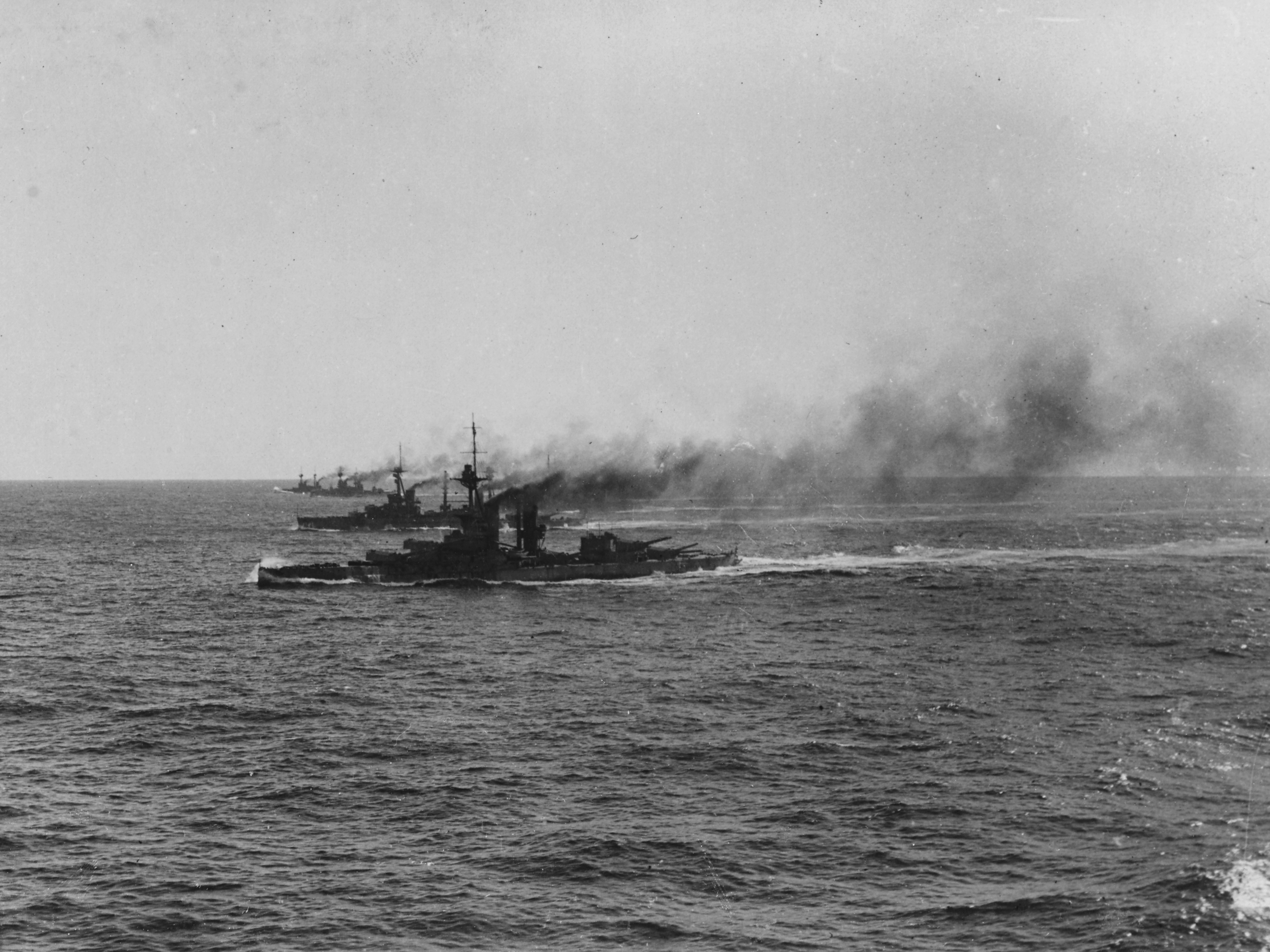
The 4th Battle Squadron steaming in line abreast in the North Sea, 1915. The ship nearest the camera is of the Iron Duke class (probably either Benbow or Emperor of India). The second ship is Agincourt. The two ships in the distance are (in no order): Bellerophon and Temeraire.

On 15 July 1914, Temeraire was transferred to the 4th Battle Squadron and took part in a test mobilisation and fleet review between 17 and 20 July as part of the British response to the July Crisis. Arriving in Portland on 27 July, she was ordered to proceed with the rest of the Home Fleet to Scapa Flow two days later to safeguard the fleet from a possible German surprise attack. In August, following the outbreak of the First World War, the Home Fleet was reorganised as the Grand Fleet, and placed under the command of Admiral John Jellicoe. Most of it was briefly based (22 October to 3 November) at Lough Swilly, Ireland, while the defences at Scapa were strengthened. On the evening of 22 November, the Grand Fleet conducted a fruitless sweep in the southern half of the North Sea; Temeraire stood with the main body in support of Vice-Admiral David Beatty's 1st Battlecruiser Squadron. The fleet was back in port in Scapa Flow by 27 November. (Note: In his 1919 book, Jellicoe generally only named specific ships when they were undertaking individual actions. Usually he referred to the Grand Fleet as a whole, or by squadrons and, unless otherwise specified, this article assumes that Temeraire is participating in the activities of the Grand Fleet.) On 16 December, the Grand Fleet sortied during the German raid on Scarborough, Hartlepool and Whitby, but failed to make contact with the High Seas Fleet. Temeraire and the 4th BS conducted target practice north of the Hebrides on 24 December and then rendezvoused with the rest of the Grand Fleet for another sweep of the North Sea on 25–27 December.

Jellicoe's ships, including Temeraire, conducted gunnery drills on 10–13 January 1915 west of Orkney and Shetland. On the evening of 23 January, the bulk of the Grand Fleet sailed in support of Beatty's battlecruisers, but they were too far away to participate in the ensuing Battle of Dogger Bank the following day. On 8 February, Captain Allen Hunt relieved Alexander-Sinclair. On 7–10 March, the Grand Fleet made a sweep in the northern North Sea, during which it conducted training manoeuvres. Another such cruise took place on 16–19 March. On 11 April, the fleet patrolled the central North Sea and returned to port on 14 April; another patrol in the area took place on 17–19 April, followed by gunnery drills off Shetland on 20–21 April.

The Grand Fleet swept the central North Sea on 17–19 May and 29–31 May without encountering any German vessels. Temeraire was refitted at Devonport in mid-1915 and rejoined the 4th BS in August. On 2–5 September, the fleet went on another cruise in the northern end of the North Sea and conducted gunnery drills. Throughout the rest of the month, the Grand Fleet was performing numerous training exercises before making another sweep into the North Sea on 13–15 October. Almost three weeks later, Temeraire participated in another fleet training operation west of Orkney during 2–5 November.

The fleet departed for a cruise in the North Sea on 26 February 1916; Jellicoe had intended to use the Harwich Force of cruisers and destroyers to sweep the Heligoland Bight, but bad weather prevented operations in the southern North Sea. As a result, the operation was confined to the northern end of the sea. Hunt was relieved in his turn by Captain Edwin Underhill on 3 March. Another sweep began on three days later, but had to be abandoned the following day as the weather grew too severe for the escorting destroyers. On the night of 25 March, Temeraire and the rest of the fleet sailed from Scapa Flow to support Beatty's battlecruisers and other light forces raiding the German Zeppelin base at Tondern. By the time the Grand Fleet approached the area on 26 March, the British and German forces had already disengaged and a strong gale threatened the light craft, so the fleet was ordered to return to base. On 21 April, the Grand Fleet conducted a demonstration off Horns Reef to distract the Germans while the Imperial Russian Navy relaid its defensive minefields in the Baltic Sea. The fleet returned to Scapa Flow on 24 April and refuelled before proceeding south in response to intelligence reports that the Germans were about to launch a raid on Lowestoft, but only arrived in the area after the Germans had withdrawn. On 2–4 May, the fleet conducted another demonstration off Horns Reef to keep German attention focused on the North Sea.

==== Battle of Jutland ====
Maps showing the manoeuvres of the British (blue) and German (red) fleets on 31 May – 1 June 1916

In an attempt to lure out and destroy a portion of the Grand Fleet, the High Seas Fleet, composed of 16 dreadnoughts, 6 pre-dreadnoughts, and supporting ships, departed the Jade Bight early on the morning of 31 May. The fleet sailed in concert with Rear Admiral Franz von Hipper's five battlecruisers. The Royal Navy's Room 40 had intercepted and decrypted German radio traffic containing plans of the operation. In response the Admiralty ordered the Grand Fleet, totalling some 28 dreadnoughts and 9 battlecruisers, to sortie the night before to cut off and destroy the High Seas Fleet.

On 31 May, Temeraire was the fifteenth ship from the head of the battle line after deployment. During the first stage of the general engagement, the ship fired five salvos from her main guns at the crippled light cruiser SMS Wiesbaden from 18:34, (Note: The times used in this section are in UT, which is one hour behind CET, which is often used in German works.) claiming two or three hits. At 19:17, the ship fired seven salvos at the battlecruiser SMS Derfflinger, but did not make any hits. About ten minutes later, Temeraire engaged several German destroyer flotillas with three salvos from her main armament without result. This was the last time that the ship fired her guns during the battle. She received no damage and fired a total of 72 twelve-inch shells (all high explosive) and 50 shells from her four-inch guns during the battle.

==== Subsequent activity ====
The Grand Fleet sortied on 18 August to ambush the High Seas Fleet while it advanced into the southern North Sea, but a series of miscommunications and mistakes prevented Jellicoe from intercepting the German fleet before it returned to port. Two light cruisers were sunk by German U-boats during the operation, prompting Jellicoe to decide to not risk the major units of the fleet south of 55° 30' North due to the prevalence of German submarines and mines. The Admiralty concurred and stipulated that the Grand Fleet would not sortie unless the German fleet was attempting an invasion of Britain or there was a strong possibility it could be forced into an engagement under suitable conditions.

The Grand Fleet sortied on the afternoon of 23 April 1918 after radio transmissions revealed that the High Seas Fleet was at sea after a failed attempt to intercept the regular British convoy to Norway. The Germans were too far ahead of the British, and no shots were fired. In October, Temeraire and her sister ship, Superb, were transferred to the Mediterranean Fleet, commanded by Vice-Admiral Sir Somerset Gough-Calthorpe. They were part of the squadron that entered the Ottoman capital, Constantinople, on 13 November, following the Armistice of Mudros. A month later, Gough-Calthorpe tasked Temeraire to provide a crew for the Russian destroyer Schastlivy, which had been turned over to the Allies by the Germans after the Armistice of 11 November. On 13 February 1919, Captain Francis Caulfeild relieved Underhill. The ship remained in the Black Sea and Ottoman waters until 3 April, when she departed for home, having visited Sevastopol, Russia, and Haifa, Palestine, during her deployment.

Upon her arrival at Devonport on 23 April, Temeraire was reduced to reserve as she was thoroughly obsolete in comparison to the latest dreadnoughts. Five months later, to the day, she recommissioned as a cadet training ship and began her first training cruise to the Mediterranean on 8 October. Upon her arrival at Portsmouth on 11 April 1921, the ship was relieved of her duty and she sailed for Rosyth, Scotland, four days later to be listed for disposal. She was sold to the Stanlee Shipbreaking & Salvage Co. for scrap in late 1921 and was towed to Dover for demolition in February 1922.

== Bibliography ==
- Brooks, John (1996). "Percy Scott and the Director". In McLean, David; Preston, Antony (eds.). Warship 1996. London: Conway Maritime Press. pp. 150–170. ISBN 0-85177-685-X.
- Burt, R. A. (2012) [1986]. British Battleships of World War One. Annapolis, Maryland: Naval Institute Press. ISBN 978-1-59114-053-5.
- Campbell, N. J. M. (1986). Jutland: An Analysis of the Fighting. Annapolis, Maryland: Naval Institute Press. ISBN 0-87021-324-5.
- Colledge, J. J.; Warlow, Ben (2006) [1969]. Ships of the Royal Navy: The Complete Record of All Fighting Ships of the Royal Navy from the 15th Century to the Present (3rd Rev ed.). London: Chatham Publishing. ISBN 978-1-86176-281-8. OCLC 67375475.
- Dodson, Aidan (2026). "The Cadet Training Ships of the Royal Navy". In Jordan, John (ed.). Warship 2026. Osprey Publishing. pp. 156–174. ISBN 978-1-4728-7259-3.
- Friedman, Norman (2011). Naval Weapons of World War One: Guns, Torpedoes, Mines and ASW Weapons of All Nations; An Illustrated Directory. Barnsley, UK: Seaforth Publishing. ISBN 978-1-84832-100-7.
- Halpern, Paul G., ed. (2011). The Mediterranean Fleet 1920–1929. Navy Records Society Publications. Vol. 158. Farnham, Surrey, UK: Ashgate. ISBN 978-1-4094-2756-8.
- Halpern, Paul G. (1995). A Naval History of World War I. Annapolis, Maryland: Naval Institute Press. ISBN 1-55750-352-4.
- Jellicoe, John (1919). The Grand Fleet, 1914–1916: Its Creation, Development, and Work. New York: George H. Doran Company. OCLC 13614571.
- Konstam, Angus (2013). British Battleships 1914-18 (1): The Early Dreadnoughts. New Vanguard. Vol. 200. Botley, UK: Osprey. ISBN 978-1-78096-167-5.
- Massie, Robert K. (2003). Castles of Steel: Britain, Germany, and the Winning of the Great War at Sea. New York: Random House. ISBN 0-679-45671-6.
- Monograph No. 12: The Action of Dogger Bank–24th January 1915 (PDF). Naval Staff Monographs (Historical). Vol. III. The Naval Staff, Training and Staff Duties Division. 1921. pp. 209–226. OCLC 220734221.
- Newbolt, Henry (1996) [1931]. Naval Operations. History of the Great War Based on Official Documents. Vol. V. Nashville, Tennessee: Battery Press. ISBN 0-89839-255-1.
- Parkes, Oscar (1990) [1966]. British Battleships, Warrior 1860 to Vanguard 1950: A History of Design, Construction, and Armament (New & rev. ed.). Annapolis, Maryland: Naval Institute Press. ISBN 1-55750-075-4.
- Preston, Antony (1972). Battleships of World War I: An Illustrated Encyclopedia of the Battleships of All Nations 1914–1918. New York: Galahad Books. ISBN 0-88365-300-1.
- Preston, Antony (1985). "Great Britain and Empire Forces". In Gray, Randal (ed.). Conway's All the World's Fighting Ships 1906–1921. Annapolis, Maryland: Naval Institute Press. pp. 1–104. ISBN 0-85177-245-5.
- Silverstone, Paul H. (1984). Directory of the World's Capital Ships. New York: Hippocrene Books. ISBN 0-88254-979-0.
- Tarrant, V. E. (1999) [1995]. Jutland: The German Perspective: A New View of the Great Battle, 31 May 1916. London: Brockhampton Press. ISBN 1-86019-917-8.
