= Edward Francis Bruen =

Royal Navy Admiral (1866–1952)

Bruen in 1920.

Admiral Edward Francis Bruen, CB (7 November 1866 – 22 November 1952) was a Royal Navy officer.

Admiral Bruen was the son of the Irish Conservative politician Henry Bruen. He entered HMS Britannia as a cadet in 1880.

Bruen commanded the battleship HMS Bellerophon from 1913 to 1916, in which he took part in the Battle of Jutland in 1916. Later that year, he took command of the new battleship HMS Resolution.

He was Director of Naval Equipment from 1920 to 1922.
