= HMS Superb (1907) =

Bellerophon-class British dreadnought

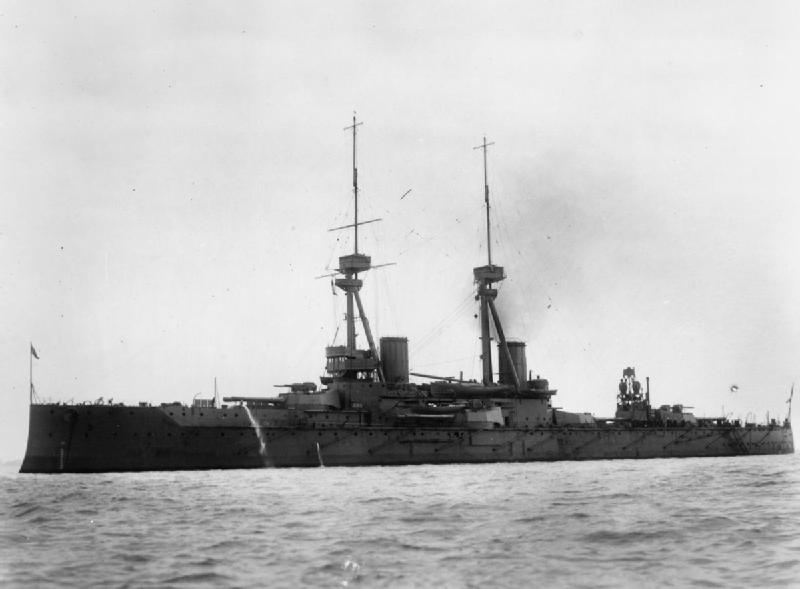
- Superb at anchor, shortly after completion in 1909

History

United Kingdom
- Name: Superb
- Ordered: 26 December 1906
- Builder: Armstrong Whitworth, Elswick
- Laid down: 6 February 1907
- Launched: 7 November 1907
- Commissioned: 29 May 1909
- Decommissioned: 26 March 1920
- Out of service: May 1922
- Fate: Sold for scrap, December 1922

General characteristics (as built)
- Class & type: Bellerophon-class dreadnought battleship
- Displacement: 18,596 long tons (18,894 t) (normal)
- Length: 526 ft (160.3 m) (o/a)
- Beam: 82 ft 6 in (25.1 m)
- Draught: 27 ft (8.2 m)
- Installed power: 23,000 shp (17,000 kW); 18 × water-tube boilers
- Propulsion: 4 × shafts; 2 × steam turbine sets
- Speed: 21 knots (39 km/h; 24 mph)
- Range: 5,720 nmi (10,590 km; 6,580 mi) at 10 knots (19 km/h; 12 mph)
- Complement: 840
- Armament: 5 × twin 12 in (305 mm) guns; 16 × single 4 in (102 mm) guns; 3 × 18-inch (450 mm) torpedo tubes
- Armour: Belt: 8–10 in (203–254 mm); Deck: 0.75–4 in (19–102 mm); Turrets: 11 in (279 mm); Barbettes: 5–10 in (127–254 mm)

HMS Superb was one of three Bellerophon-class dreadnought battleships built for the Royal Navy in the first decade of the 20th century. She spent almost her whole career assigned to the Home and Grand Fleets. Aside from participating in the Battle of Jutland in May 1916 and the inconclusive action of 19 August, her service during the First World War generally consisted of routine patrols and training in the North Sea.

Superb was transferred to the Mediterranean Fleet in October 1918 and became its flagship. She supported Allied forces in the Mediterranean and the Black Sea after the war ended in November. The ship was deemed obsolete and was reduced to reserve when she returned home in early 1919 and was then used as a training ship. Superb was used for gunnery experiments in 1920 and then became a target ship in 1922. The ship was sold for scrap late that year and broken up in 1923.

== Design and description ==
The design of the Bellerophon class was derived from that of the revolutionary (Note: Dreadnought was the first battleship with a homogenous main armament, and was the most powerful and fastest battleship in the world at the time of her completion. She made all other battleships obsolete and gave her name to all the subsequent battleships of her type.) battleship HMS Dreadnought, with a slight increase in size, armour and a more powerful secondary armament. Superb had an overall length of 526 feet (160.3 m), a beam of 82 feet 6 inches (25.1 m), and a normal draught of 27 feet (8.2 m). She displaced 18,596 long tons (18,894 t) at normal load and 22,359 long tons (22,718 t) at deep load. In 1914 her crew numbered 840 officers and ratings.

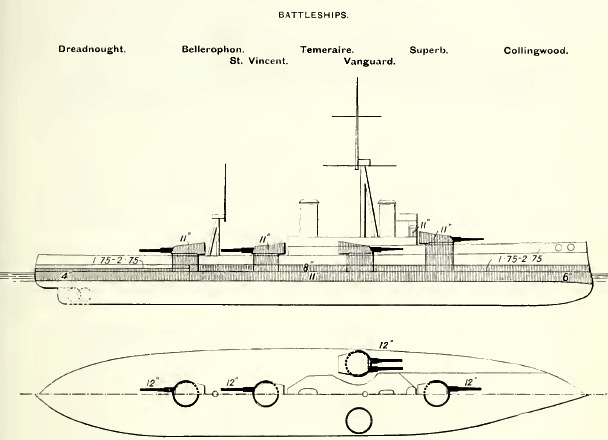
Right elevation and plan of the first generation of British dreadnoughts from Brassey's Naval Annual, 1912

The Bellerophons were powered by two sets of Parsons direct-drive steam turbines, each driving two shafts, using steam from eighteen Yarrow boilers. The turbines were rated at 23,000 shaft horsepower (17,000 kW) and intended to give the ship a maximum speed of 21 knots (39 km/h; 24 mph). During Superb's sea trials on 2 April 1909, she reached a top speed of 21.56 knots (39.93 km/h; 24.81 mph) from 27,407 shp (20,437 kW). The ship carried enough coal and fuel oil to give her a range of 5,720 nautical miles (10,590 km; 6,580 mi) at a cruising speed of 10 knots (19 km/h; 12 mph).

=== Armament and armour ===
The Bellerophon class was equipped with ten breech-loading (BL) 12-inch (305 mm) Mk X guns in five twin-gun turrets, three along the centreline and the remaining two as wing turrets. The centreline turrets were designated 'A', 'X' and 'Y', from front to rear, and the port and starboard wing turrets were 'P' and 'Q' respectively. The secondary, or anti-torpedo boat armament, comprised 16 BL 4-inch (102 mm) Mk VII guns in single mounts. Two of these guns were each installed on the roofs of the fore and aft centreline turrets and the wing turrets in unshielded mounts, and the other eight were positioned in the superstructure. (Note: Sources disagree on the type and composition of the secondary armament. Burt claims that they were the older quick-firing QF Mark III guns. Neither book by Preston identifies the type, but he does call them quick-firers. Parkes also does not identify the type, but he does say that they were 50-calibre guns and Preston agrees. Friedman shows the QF Mark III as a 40-calibre gun and states that the 50-calibre BL Mark VII gun armed all of the early dreadnoughts.) The ships were also fitted with three 18-inch (450 mm) torpedo tubes, one on each broadside and the third in the stern.

The Bellerophon-class ships had a waterline belt of Krupp cemented armour that was 10 inches (254 mm) thick between the fore and aftmost barbettes. The three armoured decks ranged in thicknesses from 0.75 to 4 inches (19 to 102 mm). The main battery turret faces were 11 inches (279 mm) thick, and the turrets were supported by 9–10 inches (229–254 mm) thick barbettes.

==== Modifications ====
The guns on the forward turret roof were transferred to the superstructure in 1914 and the guns from the wing turrets were remounted in the aft superstructure in 1914–1915; all of the four-inch guns in the superstructure were enclosed to better protect their crews. In addition, a single three-inch (76 mm) anti-aircraft (AA) gun was added on the former searchlight platform between the aft turrets. Shortly afterwards, the guns on the aft turret were removed as were one pair from the superstructure. Around the same time another three-inch AA gun was added to the aft turret roof.

By May 1915, a fire-control director had been installed high on the forward tripod mast and approximately 23 long tons (23 t) of additional deck armour was added after the Battle of Jutland a year later. By April 1917, Superb had exchanged the three-inch AA gun on 'Y' turret for a four-inch gun and the stern torpedo tube had been removed. In 1918 a high-angle rangefinder was fitted, the starboard aft four-inch gun was removed and the four-inch AA gun was moved to the quarterdeck. By this time, the ship mounted 11 four-inch guns, plus one three- and one four-inch AA gun. After the war ended, both AA guns were removed.

== Construction and career ==
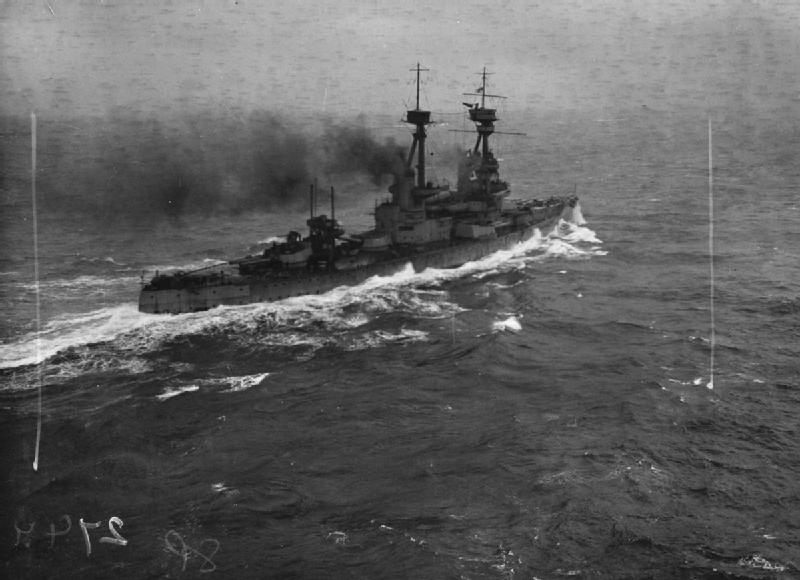
Aerial view of Superb underway, 1917

Superb was the eighth ship of her name to serve in the Royal Navy. The ship was ordered on 26 December 1906 and was laid down by Armstrong Whitworth at their shipyard in Elswick on 6 February 1907. She was launched on 7 November and completed in May 1909. Including her armament, her cost is variously quoted at £1,676,529 or £1,641,114. Superb was commissioned on 29 May 1909 and assigned to the 1st Division of the Home Fleet, under the command of Captain Frederick Tudor. She was reviewed by King Edward VII and Tsar Nicholas II of Russia during Cowes Week on 31 July. The ship participated in fleet manoeuvres in April and July before beginning a refit in late 1910 at Portsmouth. Captain Herbert Heath relieved Tudor on 16 August. Superb took part in the combined exercises for the Mediterranean, Home and Atlantic Fleets in January 1911 and was present during the Coronation Fleet Review for King George V at Spithead on 24 June. Heath was relieved by Captain Ernest Gaunt on 22 September. On 1 May 1912, the 1st Division was renamed the 1st Battle Squadron (BS). The ship was present in the Parliamentary Naval Review on 9 July at Spithead and then participated in manoeuvres in October. On 30 April 1913 Captain George Hope assumed command. The following July, the squadron visited Cherbourg, France.

=== First World War ===
Superb took part in a test mobilisation and fleet review between 17 and 20 July 1914 as part of the British response to the July Crisis. Arriving in Portland on 27 July, she was ordered to proceed with the rest of the Home Fleet to Scapa Flow two days later to safeguard the fleet from a possible German surprise attack. Captain Price Lewes relived Hope on 28 July. In August, following the outbreak of World War I, the Home Fleet was reorganised as the Grand Fleet, and placed under the command of Admiral John Jellicoe. Most of it was briefly based (22 October to 3 November) at Lough Swilly, Ireland, while the defences at Scapa were strengthened. Lewes was relieved on 4 November for reasons of ill-health and died five days later from a kidney disease. Captain Rudolf Bentinck assumed command of the ship on the 6th. On the evening of 22 November, the Grand Fleet conducted a fruitless sweep in the southern half of the North Sea, during which Superb stood with the main body in support of Vice-Admiral David Beatty's 1st Battlecruiser Squadron. The fleet was back in port in Scapa Flow by 27 November. (Note: In his 1919 book, Jellicoe generally only named specific ships when they were undertaking individual actions. Usually he referred to the Grand Fleet as a whole, or by squadrons and, unless otherwise specified, this article assumes that Superb is participating in the activities of the Grand Fleet.) The 1st BS cruised north-west of the Shetland Islands and conducted gunnery practice on 8–12 December. Four days later, the Grand Fleet sortied during the German raid on Scarborough, Hartlepool and Whitby, but failed to make contact with the High Seas Fleet. Superb and the rest of the Grand Fleet conducted another sweep of the North Sea on 25–27 December.

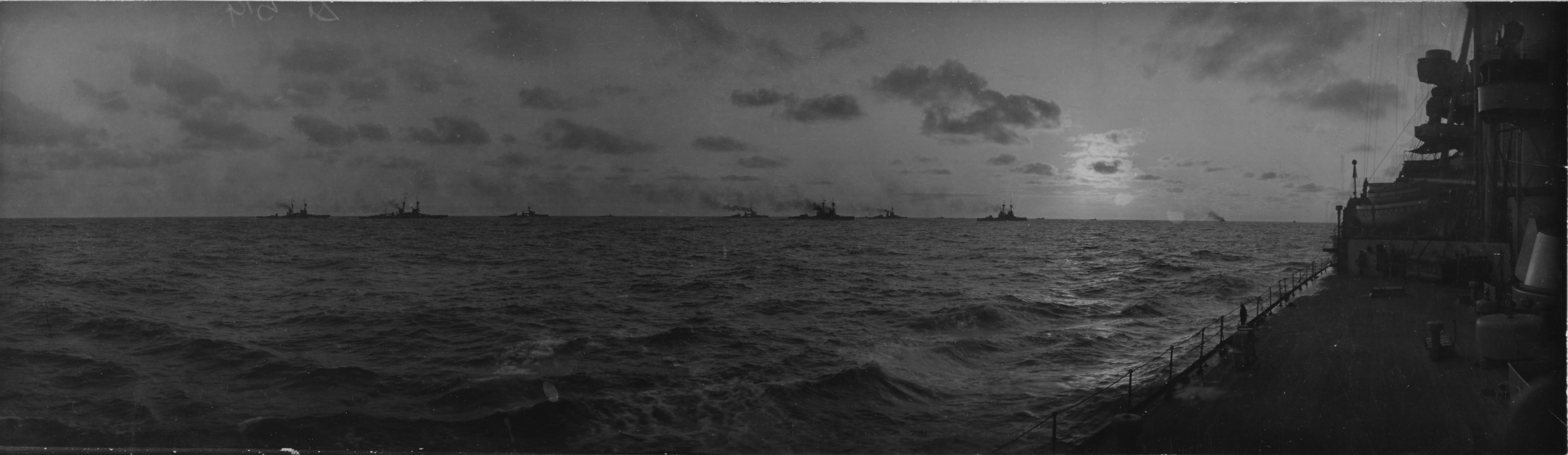
The 1st Battle Squadron at sea, April 1915

The ship departed Scapa Flow to have her turbines repaired at Portsmouth on 18 January 1915 and rejoined her squadron on 11 March. During this time, Captain Edmond Hyde Parker relieved Bentinck. On 7–10 March, the Grand Fleet made a sweep in the northern North Sea, during which it conducted training manoeuvres. Another such cruise took place on 16–19 March. On 11 April, the fleet patrolled the central North Sea and returned to port on 14 April; another patrol in the area took place on 17–19 April, followed by gunnery drills off Shetland on 20–21 April. It made further sweeps into the central North Sea on 17–19 May and 29–31 May without encountering any German vessels. Superb had to be escorted from Devonport on 16 June after the completion of her refit. (Note: The start date of this refit is unavailable, so the ship may not have been present at some of the preceding events.) The Grand Fleet conducted training off Shetland beginning on 11 July. On 2–5 September, the fleet went on another cruise in the northern end of the North Sea and conducted gunnery drills. Throughout the rest of the month, the fleet was performing numerous training exercises before making another sweep into the North Sea on 13–15 October. Almost three weeks later, Superb participated in another fleet training operation west of Orkney during 2–5 November. Five days later, the ship was transferred to the 4th Battle Squadron.

The fleet departed for a cruise in the North Sea on 26 February 1916; Jellicoe had intended to use the Harwich Force of cruisers and destroyers to sweep the Heligoland Bight, but bad weather prevented operations in the southern North Sea. As a result, the operation was confined to the northern end of the sea. Another sweep began on 6 March, but had to be abandoned the following day as the weather grew too severe for the escorting destroyers. On the night of 25 March, Superb and the rest of the fleet sailed from Scapa Flow to support Beatty's battlecruisers and other light forces raiding the German Zeppelin base at Tondern. By the time the Grand Fleet approached the area on 26 March, the British and German forces had already disengaged and a strong gale threatened the light craft, so the fleet was ordered to return to base. On 21 April, the Grand Fleet conducted a demonstration off Horns Reef to distract the Germans while the Imperial Russian Navy relaid its defensive minefields in the Baltic Sea. The fleet returned to Scapa Flow on 24 April and refuelled before proceeding south in response to intelligence reports that the Germans were about to launch a raid on Lowestoft, but only arrived in the area after the Germans had withdrawn. On 2–4 May, the fleet conducted another demonstration off Horns Reef to keep German attention focused on the North Sea. When the dreadnought Emperor of India began a refit later that month, she was relieved by Superb as the flagship of the 3rd Division of the 4th BS, commanded by Rear-Admiral Alexander Duff.

==== Battle of Jutland ====
Maps showing the manoeuvres of the British (blue) and German (red) fleets on 31 May – 1 June 1916

In an attempt to lure out and destroy a portion of the Grand Fleet, the High Seas Fleet, composed of 16 dreadnoughts, 6 pre-dreadnoughts, and supporting ships, departed the Jade Bight early on the morning of 31 May. The fleet sailed in concert with Rear Admiral Franz von Hipper's 5 battlecruisers. The Royal Navy's Room 40 had intercepted and decrypted German radio traffic containing plans of the operation. In response the Admiralty ordered the Grand Fleet, totalling some 28 dreadnoughts and 9 battlecruisers, to sortie the night before to cut off and destroy the High Seas Fleet.

On 31 May Superb was the eleventh ship from the head of the battle line after deployment. During the first stage of the general engagement, the ship opened fire with her main guns at 18:26 (Note: The times used in this section are in UT, which is one hour behind CET, which is often used in German works.) at the crippled light cruiser SMS Wiesbaden, claiming several hits. At 19:17, the ship fired seven salvos at the battlecruiser SMS Derfflinger, but did not make any hits. This was the last time that the ship fired her guns during the battle. She received no damage and fired a total of 54 twelve-inch shells (38 high explosive and 16 common pointed, capped) during the battle.

==== Subsequent activity ====
The Grand Fleet sortied on 18 August to ambush the High Seas Fleet while it advanced into the southern North Sea, but a series of miscommunications and mistakes prevented Jellicoe from intercepting the German fleet before it returned to port. Two light cruisers were sunk by German U-boats during the operation, prompting Jellicoe to decide to not risk the major units of the fleet south of 55° 30' North due to the prevalence of German submarines and mines. The Admiralty concurred and stipulated that the Grand Fleet would not sortie unless the German fleet was attempting an invasion of Britain or there was a strong possibility it could be forced into an engagement under suitable conditions. Superb was refitting at this time and did not participate in this action. On 2 January 1918, Hyde Parker was relieved by Captain Sidney Drury-Lowe before he was transferred to command the battleship Monarch on 3 April. The ship began a refit that same month before recommissioning in June. Captain Stephen Radcliffe assumed command of the ship on 22 June and remained in command until 15 December 1919.

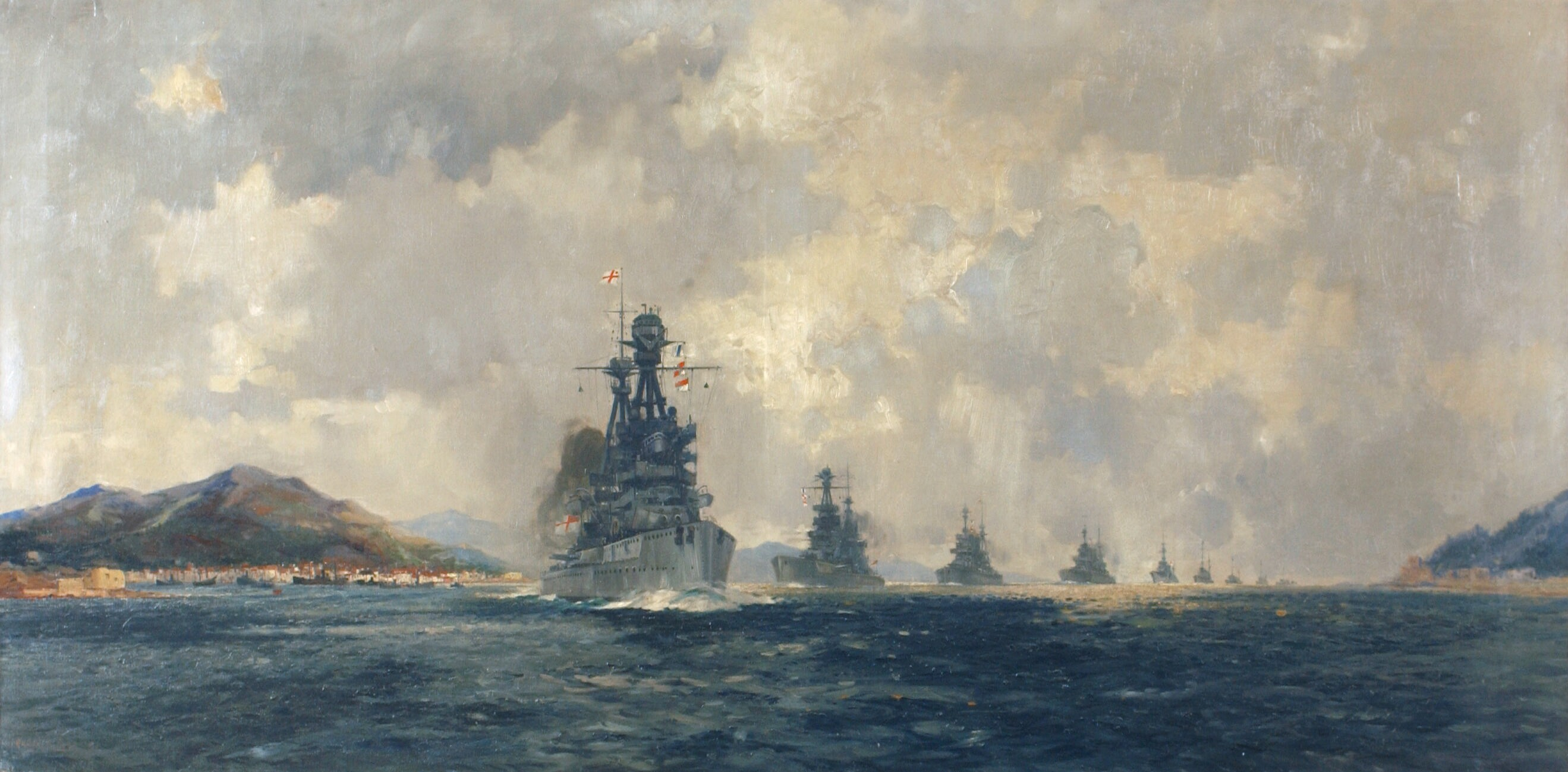
A painting by Frank Henry Mason of Superb leading the Allied fleet through the Dardanelles to Constantinople in 1918

In October 1918, Superb and her sister ship, Temeraire, were transferred to the Mediterranean Fleet and Superb became the flagship of its commander, Vice-Admiral Sir Somerset Gough-Calthorpe, upon her arrival at Mudros on 31 October. The ship led an Allied squadron that entered the Ottoman capital, Constantinople, on 13 November, following the Armistice of Mudros. A month later, Gough-Calthorpe tasked Superb to provide a crew for the Russian destroyer Derzky, which had been turned over to the Allies by the Germans after the Armistice of 11 November. On 4 December, the ship conveyed Gough-Calthorpe to Odessa, Russia, to inspect the situation there; he made another such visit to Port Said, Egypt, in late March 1919.

The following month, she was relieved and sailed for England, and was reduced to reserve at Sheerness upon her arrival on 26 April as she was thoroughly obsolete in comparison to the latest dreadnoughts. Superb became a gunnery training ship in September, until she was relieved of that duty in December. The ship was listed for disposal on 26 March 1920 at the Nore and was used for gunnery experiments in December. Beginning in May 1922, she was used as a target ship for the next several months. In December, she was sold to Stanlee Shipbreaking Company, but was not towed to Dover for demolition until 7 April 1923.

== Bibliography ==
- Brooks, John (1996). "Percy Scott and the Director". In McLean, David; Preston, Antony (eds.). Warship 1996. London: Conway Maritime Press. pp. 150–170. ISBN 0-85177-685-X.
- Burt, R. A. (1986). British Battleships of World War One. Annapolis, Maryland: Naval Institute Press. ISBN 0-87021-863-8.
- Campbell, N. J. M. (1986). Jutland: An Analysis of the Fighting. Annapolis, Maryland: Naval Institute Press. ISBN 0-87021-324-5.
- Friedman, Norman (2011). Naval Weapons of World War One: Guns, Torpedoes, Mines and ASW Weapons of All Nations; An Illustrated Directory. Barnsley, UK: Seaforth Publishing. ISBN 978-1-84832-100-7.
- Halpern, Paul, ed. (2011). The Mediterranean Fleet 1920–1929. Navy Records Society Publications. Vol. 158. Farnham, Surrey, UK: Ashgate. ISBN 978-1-4094-2756-8.
- Halpern, Paul G. (1995). A Naval History of World War I. Annapolis, Maryland: Naval Institute Press. ISBN 1-55750-352-4.
- Jellicoe, John (1919). The Grand Fleet, 1914–1916: Its Creation, Development, and Work. New York: George H. Doran Company. OCLC 13614571.
- Konstam, Angus (2013). British Battleships 1914-18 (1): The Early Dreadnoughts. New Vanguard. Vol. 200. Botley, UK: Osprey. ISBN 978-1-78096-167-5.
- Massie, Robert K. (2003). Castles of Steel: Britain, Germany, and the Winning of the Great War at Sea. New York: Random House. ISBN 0-679-45671-6.
- Monograph No. 29: Home Waters–Part IV.: From February to July 1915 (PDF). Naval Staff Monographs (Historical). Vol. XIII. The Naval Staff, Training and Staff Duties Division. 1925. OCLC 220734221.
- Monograph No. 33: Home Waters, Part VII: From June 1916 to November 1916 (PDF). Naval Staff Monographs (Historical). Vol. XVII. The Naval Staff, Training and Staff Duties Division. 1927. OCLC 220734221.
- Newbolt, Henry (1996) [1931]. Naval Operations. History of the Great War Based on Official Documents. Vol. V. Nashville, Tennessee: Battery Press. ISBN 0-89839-255-1.
- Parkes, Oscar (1990) [1966]. British Battleships, Warrior 1860 to Vanguard 1950: A History of Design, Construction, and Armament (New & rev. ed.). Annapolis, Maryland: Naval Institute Press. ISBN 1-55750-075-4.
- Preston, Antony (1972). Battleships of World War I: An Illustrated Encyclopedia of the Battleships of All Nations 1914–1918. New York: Galahad Books. ISBN 0-88365-300-1.
- Preston, Antony (1985). "Great Britain and Empire Forces". In Gray, Randal (ed.). Conway's All the World's Fighting Ships 1906–1921. Annapolis, Maryland: Naval Institute Press. pp. 1–104. ISBN 0-85177-245-5.
- Tarrant, V. E. (1999) [1995]. Jutland: The German Perspective: A New View of the Great Battle, 31 May 1916. London: Brockhampton Press. ISBN 1-86019-917-8.
