= Edwin Veale Underhill =

Royal Navy Admiral (1868–1928)

Admiral Edwin Veale Underhill, CB (27 March 1868 – 23 July 1928) was a Royal Navy officer.

In 1916, Underhill took command of the battleship HMS Temeraire, which saw action at the Battle of Jutland the same year, scoring hits against the crippled light cruiser SMS Wiesbaden and receiving no hit in return. For his part in the battle, Underhill was commended in Admiral Jellicoe's despatch and received the Russian Order of St Anne, 2nd Class (with Swords). He was appointed a CB in 1918.
