= BL 4-inch Mk VII naval gun =

Ordnance BL 4-inch gun Mk VII
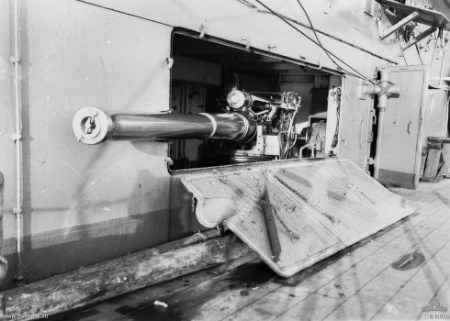
- On HMAS Australia, 1918
- Type: Naval gun
- Place of origin: United Kingdom

Service history
- In service: 1908–1945
- Used by: United Kingdom
- Wars: World War I World War II

Production history
- No. built: 600

Specifications
- Mass: 4,704 pounds (2,130 kg) (barrel & breech)
- Barrel length: 201.25 inches (5.112 m) bore (50.3 calibres)
- Shell: 31 pounds (14.06 kg) Common pointed, Common lyddite
- Calibre: 4 inches (101.6 mm)
- Breech: Welin, Single-motion screw
- Elevation: -10 degrees to +15 degrees
- Rate of fire: 6-8 rpm
- Muzzle velocity: 2,852 feet per second (869 m/s)
- Maximum firing range: 11,600 yards (10,600 m) at 15°

The BL 4-inch gun Mk VII (Note: Mk VII = Mark 7. Britain used Roman numerals to denote Marks (models) of ordnance until after World War II. Mark VII indicates this was the seventh model of BL 4-inch gun.) was a British high-velocity naval gun introduced in 1908 as an anti-torpedo boat gun in large ships, and in the main armament of smaller ships. Of the 600 produced, 482 were still available in 1939 for use as coastal artillery and as a defensive weapon on Defensively Equipped Merchant Ships (DEMS) during the Second World War.

== Naval history ==
The guns armed the following warships :

- Bellerophon-class battleships, laid down 1906
- St. Vincent-class battleships, laid down 1907
- Boadicea-class scout cruisers, laid down 1907
- HMS Neptune, laid down 1909
- Colossus-class battleships, laid down 1909
- Indefatigable-class battlecruisers, laid down 1909
- Orion-class battleships, laid down 1909
- Lion-class battlecruisers, laid down 1909
- Bristol-class light cruisers, laid down 1909
- Blonde-class scout cruisers, laid down 1909
- Active-class scout cruisers, laid down 1910
- King George V-class battleships, laid down 1911

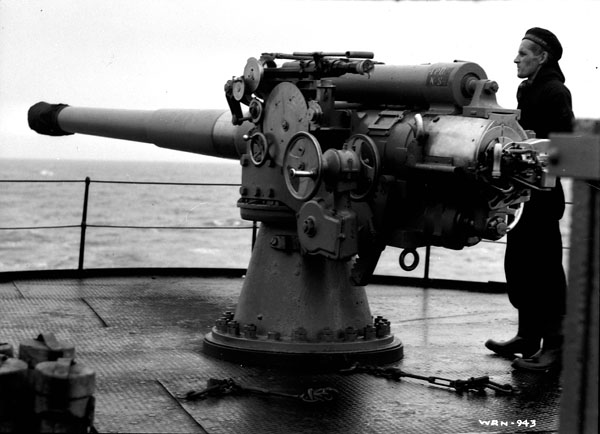
An example on a "DEMS" (defensively equipped merchant ship), 1943

The gun was succeeded in the "heavy" 4-inch class on new warships commissioned from 1914 onwards by the QF 4-inch Mk V. This new generation of warships were more heavily armed, and the BL Mk VII's role as secondary armament on capital ships and primary armament on cruisers was taken over by the BL 6-inch Mk VII and BL 6-inch Mk XII while the 4-inch calibre became the secondary armament on cruisers and primary armament on destroyers.

In World War II many guns were used to arm merchant ships.

== World War I field gun service ==
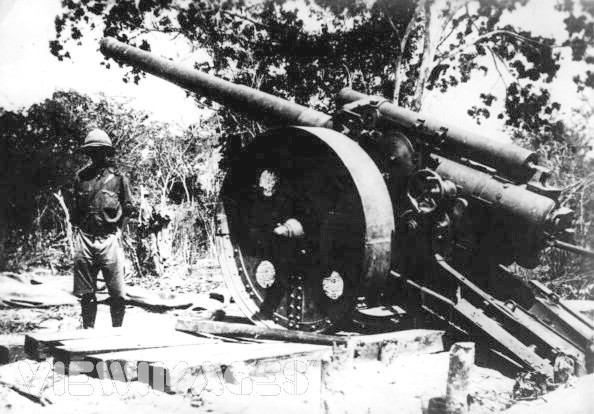
An example in East Africa, World War I.

A battery of 4 guns mounted on field carriages was first deployed with the South African Heavy Artillery in the German South West Africa campaign in 1915 and returned to England in September. They were then deployed in the East African Campaign from February 1916 with 11th Heavy Battery (renumbered 15th Battery from April 1916) manned by the Royal Marine Artillery.

== Surviving examples ==
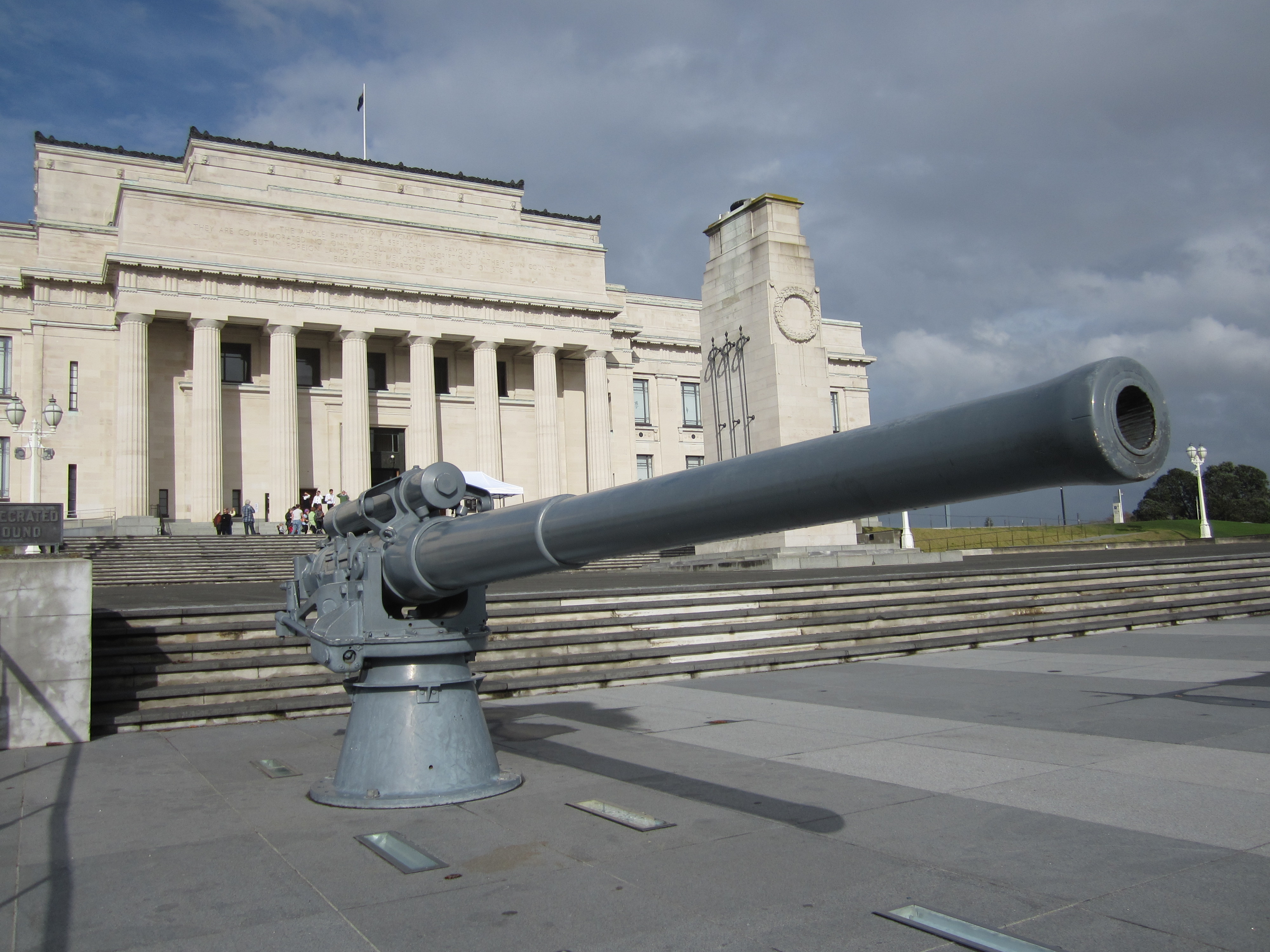
Gun from HMS New Zealand outside the Auckland War Memorial Museum.

- 2 Mk VII guns from HMS New Zealand outside the Auckland War Memorial Museum

== See also ==
- List of naval guns

=== Weapons of comparable role, performance and era ===
- 4"/50 caliber gun US equivalent

== Sources ==
- HANDBOOK for the 4" Mark VII. and VIII. B.L. Guns 1913 (Corrected to September 1913.) ADMIRALTY Gunnery Branch, G.8652/13
- Campbell, John (1987). Lambert, Andrew D. (ed.). "British Naval Guns, 1880–1945, No. 17". Warship. 10: 53–55.
- DiGiulian, Tony. British 4"/50 (10.2 cm) BL Mark VII
- Farndale, General Sir Martin. History of the Royal Regiment of Artillery : Forgotten Fronts and the Home Base 1914–18. London:The Royal Artillery Institution, 1988
- Campbell, John (1985). Naval Weapons of World War II. Naval Institute Press. ISBN 0-87021-459-4.
