= Eto Kyōsuke =

Japanese navy officer

- 江渡 恭助
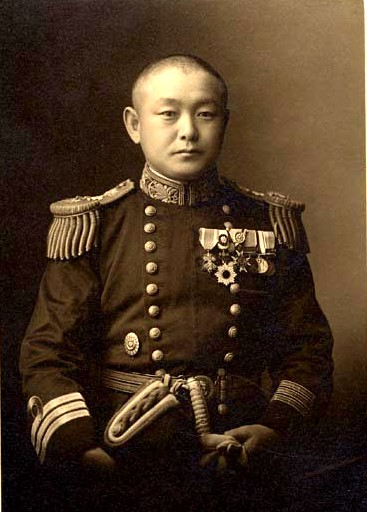
- Born: April 7, 1881; Gonohe, Aomori, Japan
- Died: July 9, 1917 (aged 36); Scapa Flow, Scotland
- Military career
- Allegiance: Empire of Japan
- Branch: Imperial Japanese Navy
- Service years: 1900 – 1917
- Rank: commander (posthumously captain)
- Conflicts: Russo-Japanese War; World War I
- Awards: Order of the Bath; Order of the Golden Kite (3rd class); Order of the Rising Sun (3rd class)

Eto Kyōsuke (江渡 恭助, Eto Kyōsuke; April 7, 1881 – July 9, 1917) was a career officer in the Imperial Japanese Navy in the Russo-Japanese War and in World War I. He was killed in the HMS Vanguard disaster of 1917.

== Biography ==
Eto was born in Gonohe, Aomori on April 7, 1881, as the first son of a local sake brewer. He was expected to succeed to the family business in the natural course of events under the primogeniture system. However, when he was a junior high school student, he told his father that he wanted to change to a high school in Tokyo to serve in the Imperial Japanese Navy in the future. He is said to have fasted for three days and succeeded in persuading his stubbornly-objecting father.

After graduating from the 28th class of Imperial Japanese Naval Academy in 1900, the major achievement in his seventeen-year career came when he was only 24 years old, in the Battle of Tsushima against Russia in 1905. Eto was the commander of the aft gun turret of the cruiser Azuma, and was decorated with the Order of the Golden Kite, 3rd Class for bravery in combat. After the war, he graduated from the 8th class of the Naval Staff College.

During the early years of World War I, he served as an officer on the Imperial Japanese Navy General Staff, and was in charge of the naval heavy artillery in the Battle of Tsingtao against Germany. In May 1916, he was assigned as a military attaché to the United Kingdom, traveling to Europe via Siberia. After his arrival, as per the Anglo-Japanese Alliance, he was assigned a position as a military observer aboard the battleship HMS Vanguard from 15 August 1916. The battleship was part of the British Home Fleet during Eto's assignment and remained in British waters.

Just before midnight on Monday 9 July 1917, HMS Vanguard suffered an explosion while stationed in Scapa Flow, Scotland. This was probably caused by an unnoticed stokehold fire heating cordite stored against an adjacent bulkhead in one of the two magazines which served the amidships turrets P and Q. She sank almost instantly, killing an estimated 843 men, including Eto; there were only two survivors. The site is now designated as a controlled site under the Protection of Military Remains Act. His family visited Orkney in 1984 and were taken to the site of Vanguard's wreck.

Eto was posthumously promoted to the rank of captain and awarded the Order of the Rising Sun, 3rd Class by the Japanese government, and made a Companion of the Order of the Bath by the British government.

There is a small display about Commander Eto in Gonohe Town Library.

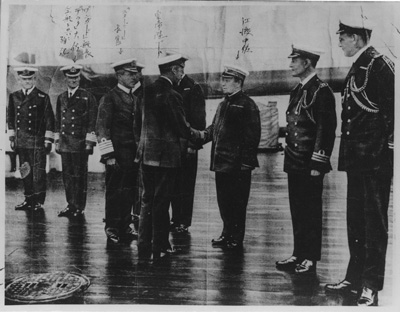
Commander Eto greeted by King George V at Scapa Flow, 10 days before the disaster
