= St Vincent-class battleship =

Warship class of the British Royal Navy

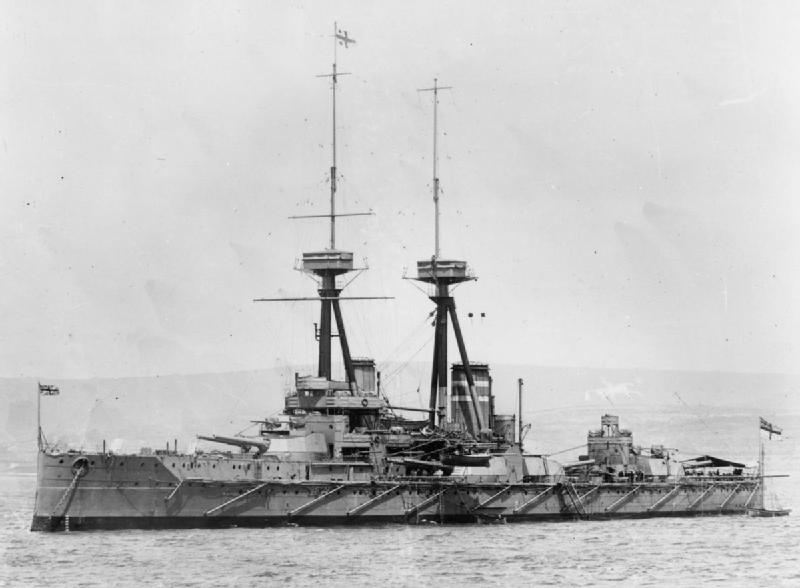
- St Vincent at anchor, 1909

Class overview
- Name: St Vincent class
- Builders: Devonport Dockyard; Portsmouth Dockyard; Vickers Armstrongs
- Operators: Royal Navy
- Preceded by: Bellerophon class
- Succeeded by: HMS Neptune
- Built: 1907–1910
- In service: 1910–1922
- In commission: 1910–1922
- Completed: 3
- Lost: 1
- Scrapped: 2

General characteristics (as built)
- Type: Dreadnought battleship
- Displacement: 19,700 long tons (20,000 t) (normal)
- Length: 536 ft (163.4 m) (o/a)
- Beam: 84 ft 2 in (25.7 m)
- Draught: 28 ft (8.5 m)
- Installed power: 24,500 shp (18,300 kW); 18 × water-tube boilers
- Propulsion: 4 × shafts; 2 × steam turbine sets
- Speed: 21 knots (39 km/h; 24 mph)
- Range: 6,900 nmi (12,800 km; 7,900 mi) at 10 knots (19 km/h; 12 mph)
- Complement: 755–835
- Armament: 5 × twin 12 in (305 mm) guns; 20 × single 4 in (102 mm) guns; 3 × 18 in (450 mm) torpedo tubes
- Armour: Belt: 8–10 inches (203–254 mm); Bulkheads: 5 and 8 inches (127 and 203 mm); Deck: .75–3 inches (19–76 mm); Turrets: 11 inches (279 mm); Barbettes: 5–10 inches (127–254 mm); Conning towers: 8 and 11 in (203 and 279 mm)

The St Vincent-class battleships were a group of three dreadnought battleships built for the Royal Navy in the first decade of the 20th century. The sister ships spent their entire careers assigned to the Home and Grand Fleets. Aside from participating in the Battle of Jutland in May 1916 and the inconclusive action of 19 August several months later, their service during the First World War generally consisted of routine patrols and training in the North Sea. Vanguard was destroyed in 1917 by a magazine explosion with the near total loss of her crew. The remaining pair were obsolete by the end of the war in 1918, and spent their remaining time either in reserve or as training ships before being sold for scrap in the early 1920s.

Vanguard's wreck was extensively salvaged before it was declared a war grave. Since 2002, it has been designated as a controlled site under the Protection of Military Remains Act 1986 and diving on the wreck is generally forbidden.

== Background and description ==
The Admiralty's 1905 draft building plan called for four capital ships in the 1907–1908 Naval Programme, but the new Liberal government cut one of these ships in mid-1906 and postponed another to the 1908–1909 Naval Programme, pending the conclusion of the ongoing Hague Peace Convention. The failure of the Germans to agree to any sort of naval arms control caused the government to reinstate the third ship. The Admiralty took until 12 June 1907 to decide not to build one of them as a battlecruiser, in favour of a squadron of four homogeneous battleships. Three of these would be part of the St Vincent class, while the single battleship planned for the 1908–1909 Naval Programme was later authorised as HMS Neptune.

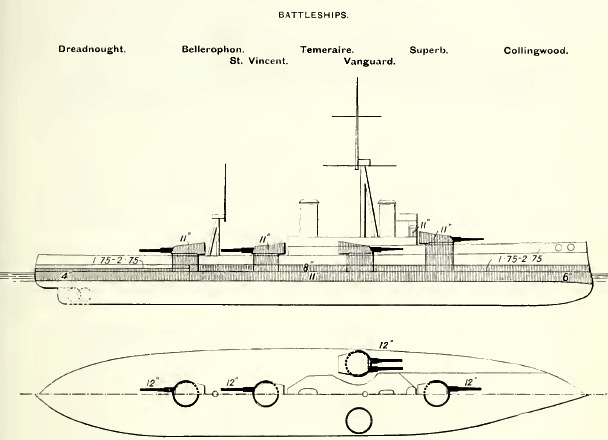
Right elevation and plan of the first generation of British dreadnoughts from the 1912 edition of Brassey's Naval Annual

The design of the St Vincent class was derived from the preceding Bellerophon class, with more powerful guns and a slight increase in size and armour. The ships had an overall length of 536 feet (163.4 m), a beam of 84 feet 2 inches (25.7 m), and a normal draught of 28 feet (8.5 m). They displaced 19,700 long tons (20,000 t) at normal load and 22,800 long tons (23,200 t) at deep load. In comparison to the Bellerophon class, the displacement of the St Vincents was increased by 650 long tons (660 t), the length by 10 feet (3 m) and the beam by 18 inches (46 cm); their crews numbered about 755 officers and ratings upon completion and 835 during the war.

The St Vincent-class ships were powered by two sets of Parsons direct-drive steam turbines, each of which was housed in a separate engine room. The outer propeller shafts were coupled to the high-pressure turbines and these exhausted into low-pressure turbines which drove the inner shafts. Separate cruising turbines were provided for each shaft. The turbines used steam from eighteen water-tube boilers at a working pressure of 235 psi (1,620 kPa; 17 kgf/cm^{2}). They were rated at 24,500 shaft horsepower (18,300 kW) and were intended to give the ships a maximum speed of 21 knots (39 km/h; 24 mph). During their sea trials, the St Vincents handily exceeded their designed speed and horsepower, reaching 21.7 knots (40.2 km/h; 25.0 mph) from 28,128 shp (20,975 kW). They carried 2,700 long tons (2,743 t) of coal and an additional 850 long tons (864 t) of fuel oil that was sprayed on the coal to increase its burn rate. This gave them a range of 6,900 nautical miles (12,800 km; 7,900 mi) at a cruising speed of 10 knots (19 km/h; 12 mph).

=== Armament ===
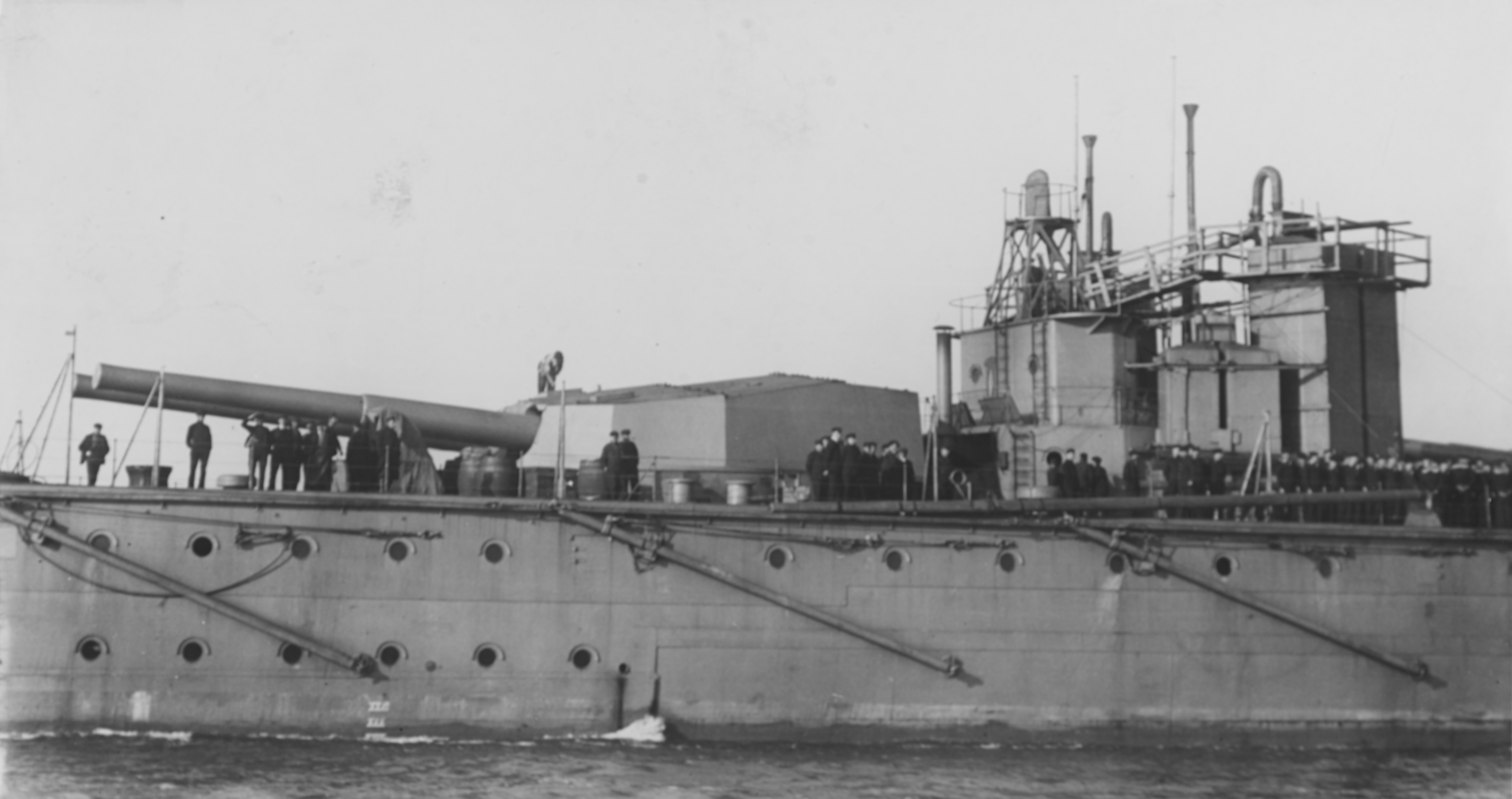
Vanguard's starboard aft side, showing her rear 12-inch gun turret and anti-torpedo net booms, around 1914

These ships were the first to carry the new 50-calibre breech-loading (BL) 12-inch (305 mm) Mark XI gun, which was 5 calibres longer and had a muzzle velocity about 75 feet per second (23 m/s) higher than the 45-calibre Mark X gun used in the earlier dreadnoughts. They had a reputation for drooping at the muzzle, which was believed to have an adverse effect at long range, but testing at sea showed the muzzle droop to be within normal tolerances and the accuracy at long range to be satisfactory. The increased muzzle velocity of the Mark XI gun gave it a longer range over the Mark X gun as well as increasing the distance at which it could penetrate 12 inches of armour from 7,600 to 9,300 yards (6,949 to 8,504 m) using the same shell. The higher velocity reduced its service life by increasing the wear in the barrel.

The St Vincent class were equipped with ten Mark XI guns in five hydraulically powered twin-gun turrets, three along the centreline and the remaining two as wing turrets. The centreline turrets were named 'A', 'X' and 'Y' from front to rear, and the port and starboard wing turrets were 'P' and 'Q' respectively. The guns had a maximum elevation of +20° which gave them a range of 21,200 yards (19,385 m). They fired 850-pound (386 kg) projectiles at a muzzle velocity of 2,825 ft/s (861 m/s) at a rate of two rounds per minute. The ships carried between 80 and 100 shells per gun.

The secondary armament of the St Vincents consisted of twenty 50-calibre BL four-inch (102 mm) Mark VII guns. Pairs of these guns were installed in unshielded mounts on the roofs of 'A', 'P', 'Q' and 'Y' turrets and the other dozen were positioned in single mounts at forecastle-deck level in the superstructure. (Note: Sources disagree on the number, type and composition of the secondary armament. Burt gives only eighteen 4-inch guns and claims that they were the older quick-firing QF Mark III guns; he also lists a 12-pounder (three-inch (76 mm)) gun. Preston concurs on the number of 4 inchers, but does not list the 12 pounder. Parkes says twenty 4-inch guns; while not identifying the type, he does say that they were 50-calibre guns and Preston agrees. Friedman shows the QF Mark III as a 40-calibre gun and states that the 50-calibre BL Mark VII gun armed all of the early dreadnoughts.) The guns had a maximum elevation of +15° which gave them a range of 11,400 yd (10,424 m) firing 31-pound (14.1 kg) projectiles at a muzzle velocity of 2,821 ft/s (860 m/s). They were provided with 150 rounds per gun; the wartime allowance for each gun was 200 rounds. Four 3-pounder 1.9 in (47 mm) saluting guns were also carried. The ships were equipped with three 18-inch (450 mm) submerged torpedo tubes, one on each broadside and another in the stern, for which nine torpedoes were provided.

=== Fire control ===
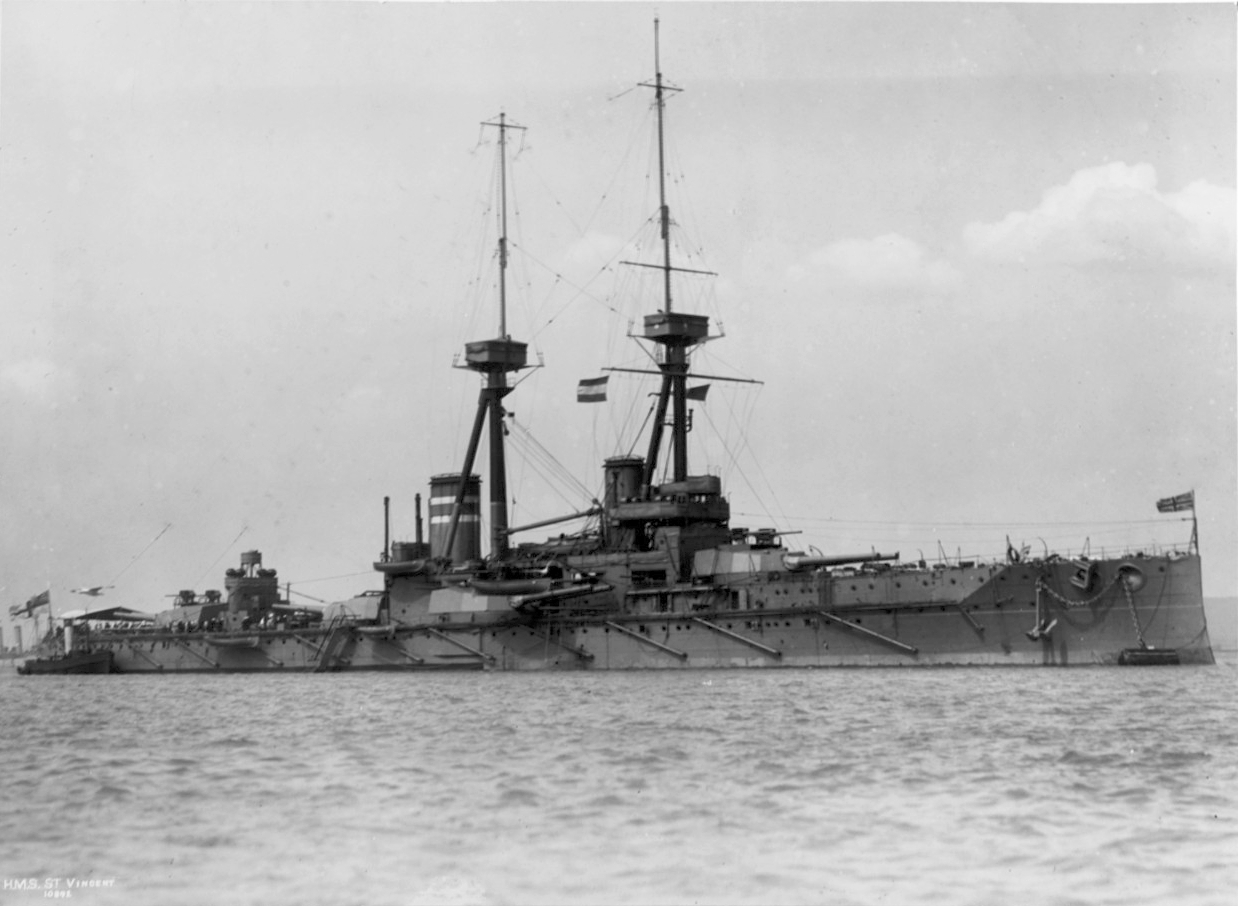
St Vincent at anchor, before 1912

The control positions for the main armament were located in the spotting tops at the head of the fore and mainmasts. Data from a 9-foot (2.7 m) Barr and Stroud coincidence rangefinder located at each control position, together with the target's speed and course information, was input into a Dumaresq mechanical computer and electrically transmitted to Vickers range clocks located in the transmitting station located beneath each position on the main deck. Wind speed and direction was called down to the transmitting station by either voicepipe or sound-powered telephone. The range clock integrated all the data and converted it into elevation and deflection data for use by the guns. The target's data was also graphically recorded on a plotting table to assist the gunnery officer in predicting the movement of the target. The turrets, transmitting stations and control positions could be connected in almost any combination. As a backup, two turrets in each ship ('A' and 'Y' in St Vincent) could take over if necessary.

In 1910–1911, the four-inch guns on the roof of the forward turret of Vanguard were replaced by a 9-or-12-foot (2.7 or 3.7 m) rangefinder. This was removed about a year later, roughly at the same time when the rooftop guns were removed from the forward turrets of the other two ships. In late 1914, the remaining rooftop guns were replaced on the three sister ships by 9-foot rangefinders protected by armoured hoods.

Fire-control technology advanced quickly during the years between the St Vincents' commissioning and the start of World War I and the most important development was the director firing system. Mounted high in the ship, a fire-control director electrically provided data to the turrets via a pointer on a dial, which the turret crewmen only had to follow. The director layer fired the guns simultaneously, which aided in spotting the shell splashes and minimised the effects of the roll on the dispersion of the shells. While the exact dates of installation are unknown, St Vincent was equipped with a director by December 1915 and the others by May 1916. The ships were fitted with Mark I Dreyer Fire-control Tables in the transmission stations by early 1916, which combined the functions of the Dumaresq and the range clock.

=== Armour ===
The St Vincent-class ships had a waterline belt of Krupp cemented armour that was 10 inches (254 mm) thick between the fore and aftmost barbettes that reduced to 2 inches (51 mm) before it reached the ships' ends. It covered the side of the hull from the middle deck down to 4 feet 11 inches (1.5 m) below the waterline where it thinned to 8 inches (203 mm) amidships. Above this was a strake of 8-inch armour. Transverse bulkheads 5 to 8 inches (127 to 203 mm) thick terminated the thickest parts of the waterline and upper armour belts once they reached the outer portions of the endmost barbettes. The three centreline barbettes were protected by armour 9 inches (229 mm) thick above the main deck and thinned to 5 inches (127 mm) below it. The wing barbettes were similar except that they had 10 inches of armour on their outer faces. The gun turrets had 11-inch (279 mm) faces and sides with 3-inch roofs.

The three armoured decks ranged in thickness from 0.75 to 3 inches (19 to 76 mm) with the greatest thickness outside the central armoured citadel. The front and sides of the forward conning tower were protected by 11-inch plates, although the rear and roof were 8 inches and 3 inches thick respectively. The aft conning tower had 8-inch sides and a 3-inch roof. The St Vincents had two longitudinal anti-torpedo bulkheads 1–3 inches (25–76 mm) thick that extended from the forward end of 'A' barbette to the end of 'Y' magazine. In the vicinity of the boiler rooms, the compartments between them were used as coal bunkers.

=== Modifications ===
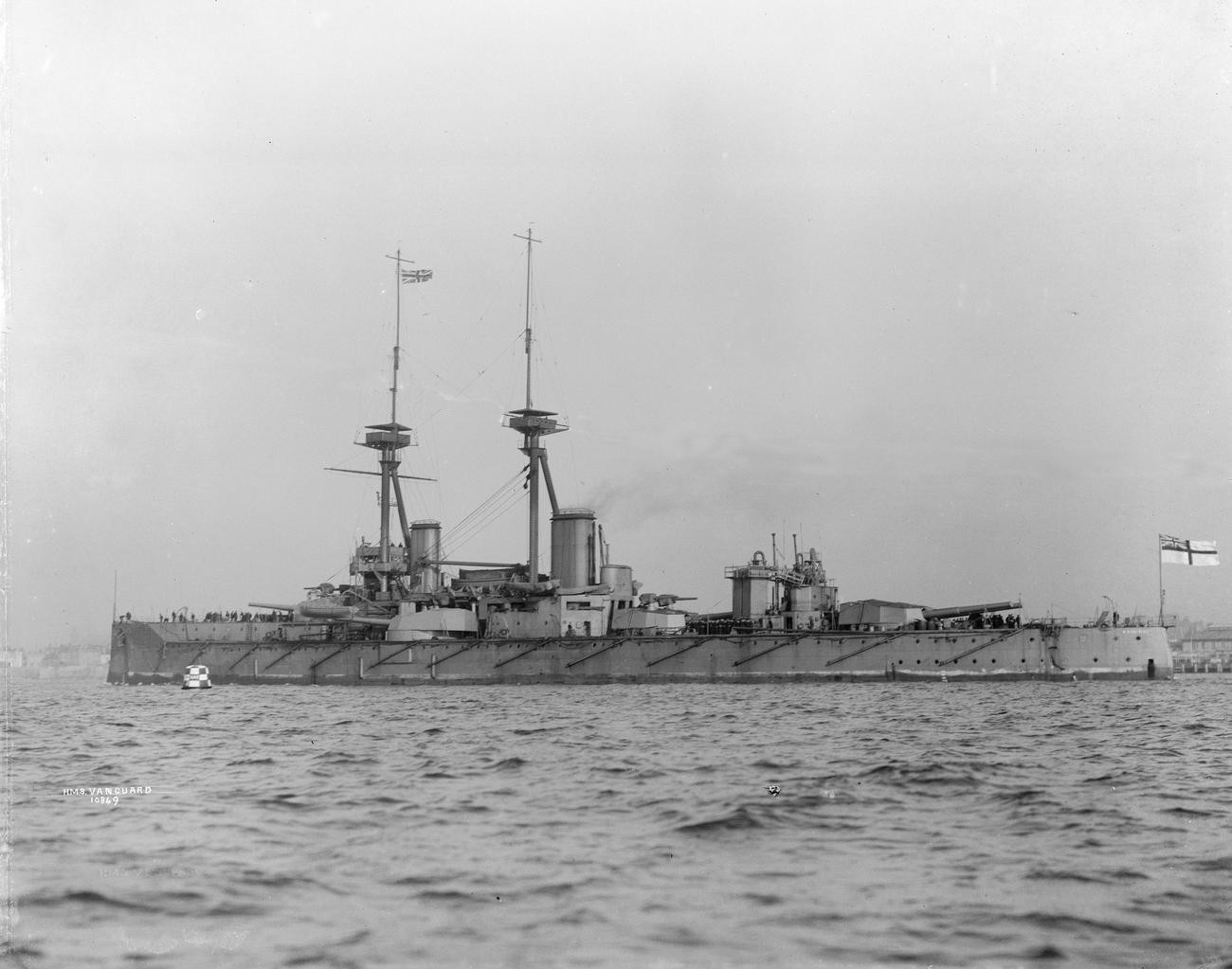
Vanguard at anchor, 1910

The guns on the forward turret roof were replaced in 1910–1911 by a rangefinder on Vanguard, and on her sisters in 1911–1912. About two years later, gun shields were fitted to most of the guns in the superstructure and the bridge structure was enlarged around the base of the forward tripod mast. During the first year of the war, the base of the forward superstructure was rebuilt to house eight 4-inch guns and the turret-top guns were removed, which reduced their secondary armament to a total of fourteen guns; a pair of 3-inch (76 mm) anti-aircraft (AA) guns were added. Approximately 50 long tons (51 t) of additional deck armour were added after the Battle of Jutland in May 1916. By April 1917, the sisters mounted thirteen 4-inch anti-torpedo boat guns as well as single 4-inch and 3-inch AA guns. The stern torpedo tube was removed in 1917–1918 and St Vincent was equipped to operate kite balloons. In 1918, a high-angle rangefinder was fitted on the forward spotting top of the surviving ships and flying-off platforms were installed on the roofs of the fore and aft turrets of Collingwood.

== Ships ==
Construction data
Ship	Builder	Price (including armament)	Laid down	Launched	Commissioned
St Vincent	HM Dockyard, Portsmouth	£1,721,970 or £1,754,615	30 December 1907	10 September 1908	3 May 1910
Collingwood	HM Dockyard, Devonport	£1,680,888 or £1,731,640	3 February 1908	7 November 1908	19 April 1910
Vanguard	Vickers Armstrong, Barrow-in-Furness	£1,464,030 or £1,607,780	2 April 1908	22 February 1909	1 March 1910

== Careers ==
Upon commissioning, all three ships were assigned to the 1st Division of the Home Fleet and St Vincent became the flagship of the division's second-in-command. In July, they were present when King George V visited the fleet in Torbay and participated in his Coronation Fleet Review at Spithead on 24 June 1911. Less than a year later, the 1st Division was renamed the 1st Battle Squadron (BS) on 1 May 1912. Collingwood became the squadron flagship on 22 June and reverted to a private ship again two years later. Each of the sisters underwent a lengthy refit before the First World War began in mid-1914.

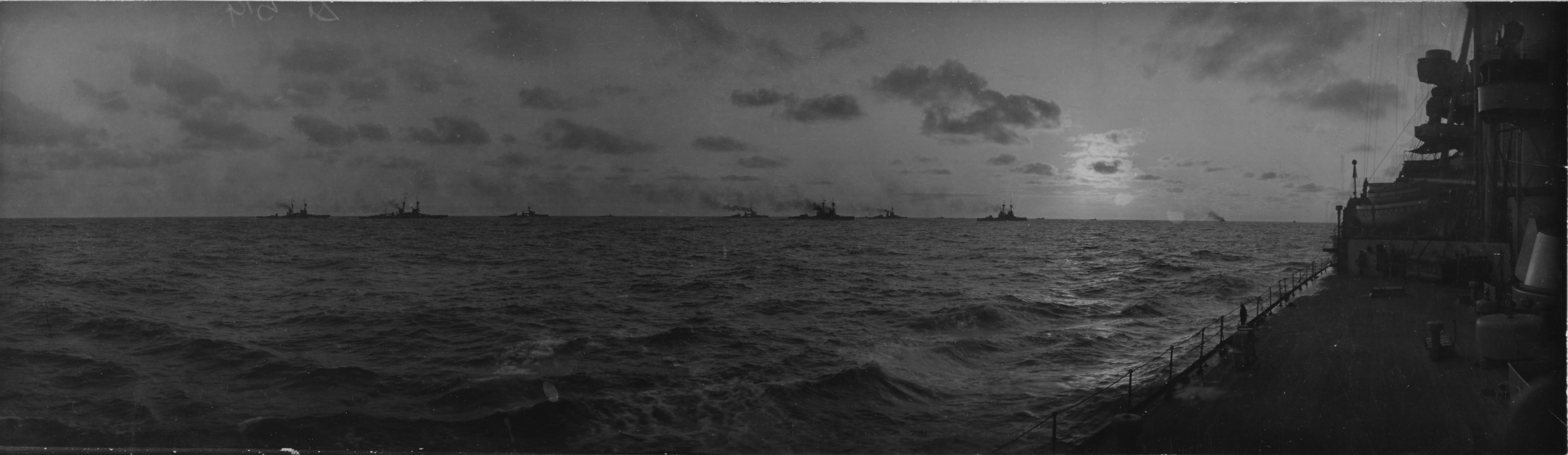
The 1st Battle Squadron at sea, April 1915

Between 17 and 20 July 1914, the sisters took part in a test mobilisation and fleet review. Arriving in Portland afterwards, they were ordered to proceed with the rest of the Home Fleet to Scapa Flow two days later to safeguard the fleet from a possible surprise attack by the Imperial German Navy. After the British declaration of war on Germany on 4 August, the Home Fleet was reorganised as the Grand Fleet and placed under the command of Admiral John Jellicoe. According to pre-war doctrine, the role of the Grand Fleet was to fight a decisive battle against the German High Seas Fleet, but German reluctance to commit their battleships against the superior British force led to indecisive operations. The Grand Fleet spent its time training in the North Sea, punctuated by the occasional mission to intercept a German raid or major fleet sortie. In April 1916, Vanguard was transferred to the 4th Battle Squadron while her sisters remained in the 1st Battle Squadron.

=== Battle of Jutland ===
Maps showing the manoeuvres of the British (blue) and German (red) fleets on 31 May – 1 June 1916

In an attempt to lure out and destroy a portion of the Grand Fleet, the German High Seas Fleet departed the Jade Bight early on the morning of 31 May 1916 in support of Rear Admiral Franz von Hipper's battlecruisers, which were to act as bait. The British code breakers of Room 40 at the Admiralty had decoded German radio traffic containing plans of the operation and the Admiralty ordered the Grand Fleet to sortie the night before the Germans, to cut off and destroy the High Seas Fleet.

The Grand Fleet rendezvoused with the 2nd Battle Squadron, coming from Cromarty, Scotland, on the morning of 31 May and Jellicoe organised the main body of the Grand Fleet in parallel columns of four-ship divisions. The two divisions of the 2nd BS were on his left (east), the 4th BS was in the centre and the 1st BS on the right. Vanguard and St Vincent were the rear ships of their divisions while Collingwood was the second ship in its division. When Jellicoe ordered the Grand Fleet to deploy to the left and form line astern in anticipation of encountering the High Seas Fleet, this naturally placed the 4th and 1st Battle Squadrons in the centre and rear of the line of battle, respectively, which meant that the sisters were in the rear of the Grand Fleet once it was deployed. This limited their ability to engage the German ships in the poor visibility. All three ships fired at the crippled light cruiser SMS Wiesbaden, possibly scoring some hits, but only St Vincent and Collingwood were able to engage any of the German capital ships. The former hit the battlecruiser SMS Moltke twice, inflicting only minor damage, while Collingwood hit the battlecruiser SMS Derfflinger once, also with little effect. Vanguard and Collingwood also fired at German destroyers, but failed to achieve any hits. None of the sisters fired more than 98 rounds from their main guns during the battle.

=== Subsequent activity ===
After the battle, St Vincent and Collingwood joined Vanguard in the 4th BS. The Grand Fleet sortied on 18 August to ambush the High Seas Fleet while it advanced into the southern North Sea, but a series of communication failures and mistakes prevented Jellicoe from intercepting the German fleet before it returned to port. Two light cruisers were sunk by German U-boats during the operation, prompting Jellicoe to decide not to risk the major units of the fleet to German submarines and mines south of 55° 30' North. The Admiralty concurred and stipulated that the Grand Fleet would not sortie unless the German fleet was attempting an invasion of Britain or there was a strong possibility it could be forced into an engagement under suitable conditions. The Admiralty order meant that the Grand Fleet spent far less time at sea. In late February 1917, the 4th BS conducted tactical exercises for a few days. In January 1918, Collingwood and some of the older dreadnoughts cruised off the coast of Norway for several days, possibly to provide distant cover for a convoy to Norway. Along with the rest of the Grand Fleet, she sortied on the afternoon of 23 April when radio transmissions revealed that the High Seas Fleet was at sea, after a failed attempt to intercept the regular British convoy to Norway. The Germans were too far ahead of the British to be caught and no shots were fired. St Vincent was under repair at Invergordon, Scotland, and could not sortie, but was present at Rosyth when the German fleet surrendered on 21 November; Collingwood was refitting in Invergordon.

==== Vanguard explosion ====
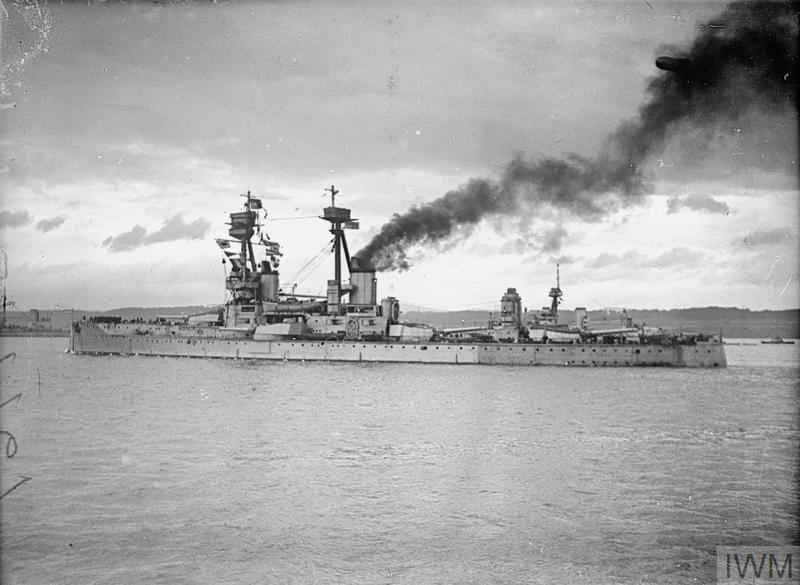
Collingwood entering Rosyth, 25 August 1917

In the evening of 9 July 1917, Vanguard's magazines exploded while she was anchored in the northern part of Scapa Flow; she sank almost instantly, with only three survivors, one of whom died soon afterwards; 842 men aboard were lost. Collingwood's crew recovered the bodies of three men killed in the explosion. The Board of Inquiry concluded that a fire of unknown origin began in a 4-inch magazine and spread to one or both of the nearby 12-inch magazines, which detonated and sank the ship.

=== Postwar years ===
In March 1919, St Vincent was reduced to reserve and became a gunnery training ship at Portsmouth. She then became flagship of the Reserve Fleet in June and was relieved as gunnery training ship in December, when she was transferred to Rosyth. There she remained until listed for disposal in March 1921; she was sold for scrap on 1 December 1921 and demolished.

In January 1919, Collingwood was transferred to Devonport and assigned to the Reserve Fleet. Upon the dissolution of the Grand Fleet on 18 March, the Reserve Fleet was renamed the Third Fleet and Collingwood became its flagship. She became a tender to HMS Vivid on 1 October and served as a gunnery and wireless telegraphy training ship until early August 1920, when the ship returned to the reserve. Collingwood served as a boys' training ship on 22 September 1921 until she was paid off on 31 March 1922. Collingwood was sold for scrap on 12 December and was broken up.

Much of Vanguard's wreck was salvaged before it was declared a war grave in 1984. The amidships portion of the ship is almost completely gone and 'P' and 'Q' turrets are some 40 metres (130 ft) away, presumably blown there by the magazine explosions. The bow and stern areas are almost intact as has been revealed by a survey authorised by the Ministry of Defence in 2016 in preparation for the centenary commemoration planned for 2017. The wreck was named a controlled site in 2002 and cannot be dived upon, except with permission from the Ministry.

== Bibliography ==
- Brady, Mark (September 2014). "HMS Collingwood War Record". Warship (177). Part Two: 19–24. ISSN 0966-6958.
- Brooks, John (2005). Dreadnought Gunnery and the Battle of Jutland: The Question of Fire Control. London: Routledge. ISBN 0-415-40788-5.
- Brooks, John (1995). "The Mast and Funnel Question: Fire-control Positions in British Dreadnoughts". In Roberts, John (ed.). Warship 1995. London: Conway Maritime Press. pp. 40–60. ISBN 0-85177-654-X.
- Brooks, John (1996). "Percy Scott and the Director". In McLean, David; Preston, Antony (eds.). Warship 1996. London: Conway Maritime Press. pp. 150–70. ISBN 0-85177-685-X.
- Burt, R. A. (1986). British Battleships of World War One. Annapolis, Maryland: Naval Institute Press. ISBN 978-0-87021-863-7.
- Campbell, N. J. M. (1986). Jutland: An Analysis of the Fighting. Annapolis, Maryland: Naval Institute Press. ISBN 0-87021-324-5.
- Corbett, Julian (1997) [1940]. Naval Operations. History of the Great War: Based on Official Documents. Vol. III (Second ed.). London and Nashville, Tennessee: Imperial War Museum in association with the Battery Press. ISBN 1-870423-50-X.
- Friedman, Norman (2015). The British Battleship 1906–1946. Barnsley, UK: Seaforth Publishing. ISBN 978-1-84832-225-7.
- Friedman, Norman (2011). Naval Weapons of World War One: Guns, Torpedoes, Mines and ASW Weapons of All Nations; An Illustrated Directory. Barnsley, UK: Seaforth Publishing. ISBN 978-1-84832-100-7.
- Halpern, Paul G. (1995). A Naval History of World War I. Annapolis, Maryland: Naval Institute Press. ISBN 1-55750-352-4.
- Massie, Robert K. (2003). Castles of Steel: Britain, Germany, and the Winning of the Great War at Sea. New York: Random House. ISBN 0-679-45671-6.
- Parkes, Oscar (1990) [1966]. British Battleships, Warrior 1860 to Vanguard 1950: A History of Design, Construction, and Armament (New & rev. ed.). Annapolis, Maryland: Naval Institute Press. ISBN 1-55750-075-4.
- Preston, Antony (1972). Battleships of World War I: An Illustrated Encyclopedia of the Battleships of All Nations 1914–1918. New York: Galahad Books. ISBN 0-88365-300-1.
- Preston, Antony (1985). "Great Britain and Empire Forces". In Gray, Randal (ed.). Conway's All the World's Fighting Ships 1906–1921. Annapolis, Maryland: Naval Institute Press. pp. 1–104. ISBN 0-85177-245-5.
- Tarrant, V. E. (1999) [1995]. Jutland: The German Perspective: A New View of the Great Battle, 31 May 1916. London: Brockhampton Press. ISBN 1-86019-917-8.
