= James Clement Ley =

Royal Navy Admiral (1869–1946)

Admiral James Clement Ley, CB, CVO (25 July 1869 – 15 July 1946) was a Royal Navy officer, who was known for his work on naval strategy and tactics.

== Naval career ==
Ley entered HMS Britannia as a cadet in 1883, was confirmed as sub-lieutenant in 1889, and promoted to lieutenant in 1890. After training as a gunnery specialist and promotion to commander, he was posted as executive officer of HMS Ocean in March 1903. In 1905 he was selected to join the staff of the newly established "War Course for Captains and Commanders", which later became the Royal Naval War College. In 1906, he was promoted to captain and was reappointed to the course, and in 1909 he was given command of HMS Cornwall, then serving as a training ship for cadets.

In 1912, Ley took command of HMS Collingwood, to which Prince Albert (later George VI) was appointed as a midshipman in 1913. In 1916, Ley and Collingwood took part in the Battle of Jutland as part of the 1st Battle Squadron. Ley was appointed a CVO in September of the same year, when Prince Albert left Collingwood on completing three years' service on the ship. In December 1916 Ley was given command of the battleship HMS Canada. In 1917, he was promoted to rear-admiral and appointed as the first Director of the Training Division of the Admiralty Naval Staff. Appointed a CB in 1918, he served as naval attaché to Tokyo for a time, before being promoted to vice-admiral and placed on the retired list in 1923. He was promoted to admiral on the retired list in 1927.
