= HMS Vanguard (1909) =

British Royal Navy battleship

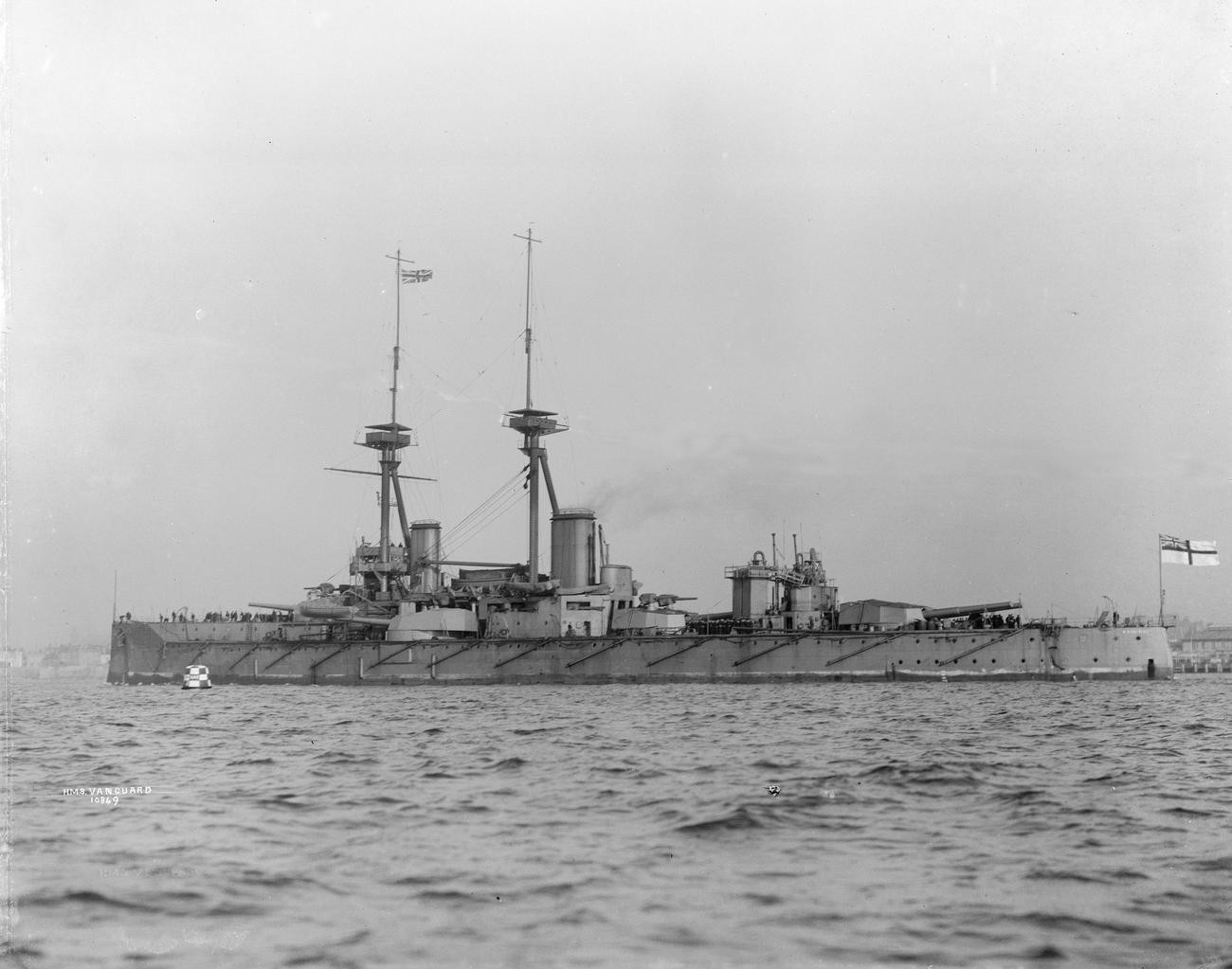
- Vanguard, 1910

History

United Kingdom
- Name: Vanguard
- Ordered: 6 February 1908
- Builder: Vickers, Barrow-in-Furness
- Laid down: 2 April 1908
- Launched: 22 February 1909
- Commissioned: 1 March 1910
- Fate: Sunk by internal explosion at Scapa Flow, 9 July 1917
- Notes: Protected war grave

General characteristics (as built)
- Class & type: St Vincent-class dreadnought battleship
- Displacement: 19,700 long tons (20,000 t) (normal)
- Length: 536 ft (163.4 m) (o/a)
- Beam: 84 ft (25.6 m)
- Draught: 28 ft (8.5 m)
- Installed power: 18 × Babcock & Wilcox boilers; 24,500 shp (18,300 kW)
- Propulsion: 4 × shafts; 2 × steam turbine sets
- Speed: 21 knots (39 km/h; 24 mph)
- Range: 6,900 nmi (12,800 km; 7,900 mi) at 10 knots (19 km/h; 12 mph)
- Complement: 753
- Armament: 5 × twin 12-inch (305 mm) guns; 20 × single 4-inch (102 mm) guns; 3 × 18-inch (450 mm) torpedo tubes
- Armour: Belt: 8–10 inches (203–254 mm); Deck: 0.75–3 inches (19–76 mm); Turrets: 11 inches (279 mm)

HMS Vanguard was one of three St Vincent-class dreadnought battleships built for the Royal Navy in the first decade of the 20th century. She spent her career assigned to the Home and Grand Fleets. Aside from participating in the Battle of Jutland in May 1916 and the inconclusive action of 19 August several months later, her service during World War I mostly consisted of routine patrols and training in the North Sea.

Shortly before midnight on 9 July 1917 at Scapa Flow, Vanguard suffered a series of magazine explosions. She sank almost instantly, killing 843 of the 845 men aboard. The wreck was heavily salvaged after the war, but was eventually protected as a war grave in 1984. It was designated as a controlled site under the Protection of Military Remains Act 1986, and diving on the wreck is generally forbidden.

== Design and description ==
The design of the St Vincent class was derived from that of the previous Bellerophon class, with a slight increase in size, armour and more powerful guns, among other minor changes. Vanguard had an overall length of 536 feet (163.4 m), a beam of 84 feet (25.6 m), and a normal draught of 28 feet (8.5 m). She displaced 19,700 long tons (20,000 t) at normal load and 22,800 long tons (23,200 t) at deep load. In 1910 her crew numbered 753 officers and ratings.

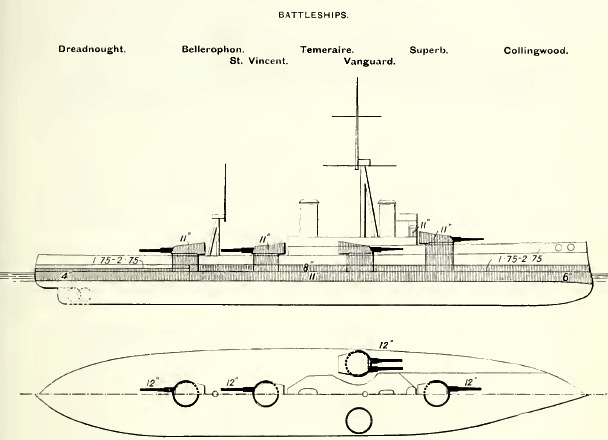
Right elevation and plan of the first generation of British dreadnoughts from Brassey's Naval Annual, 1912

Vanguard was powered by two sets of Parsons direct-drive steam turbines, each driving two shafts, using steam from eighteen Babcock & Wilcox boilers. The turbines were rated at 24,500 shaft horsepower (18,300 kW) and intended to give the ship a maximum speed of 21 knots (39 km/h; 24 mph). During her sea trials on 17 December 1909, she unofficially reached a top speed of 22.3 knots (41.3 km/h; 25.7 mph) from 25,780 shp (19,220 kW), although she must have been lightly loaded to reach this speed. Vanguard carried enough coal and fuel oil to give her a range of 6,900 nautical miles (12,800 km; 7,900 mi) at a cruising speed of 10 knots (19 km/h; 12 mph).

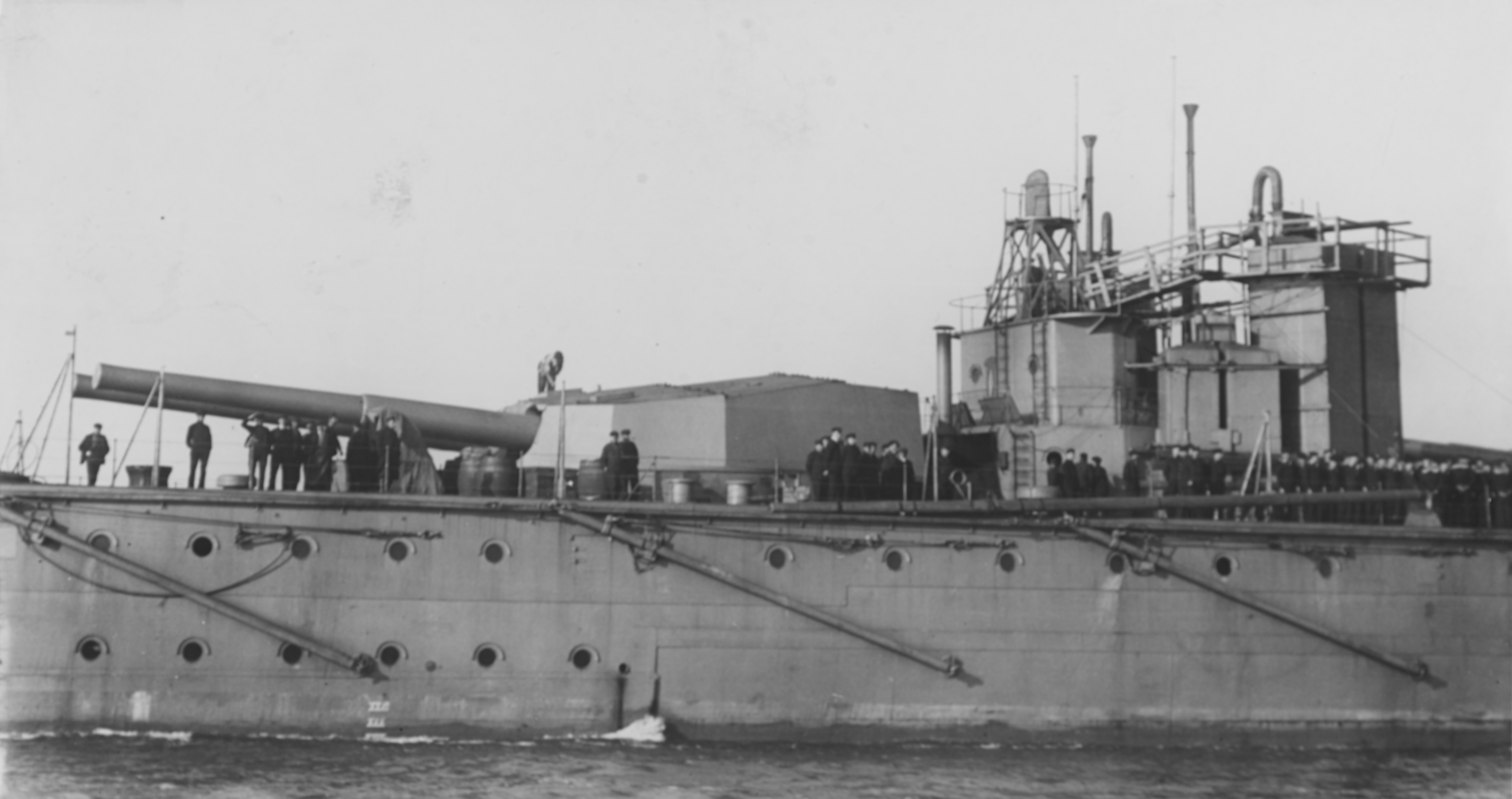
Vanguard's starboard aft side, showing her rear 12-inch gun turret and anti-torpedo net booms, around 1914

The St Vincent class was equipped with ten breech-loading (BL) 12-inch (305 mm) Mk XI guns in five twin-gun turrets, three along the centreline and the remaining two as wing turrets. The centreline turrets were designated 'A', 'X' and 'Y', from front to rear, and the port and starboard wing turrets were 'P' and 'Q' respectively. The secondary, or anti-torpedo boat armament, comprised twenty BL 4-inch (102 mm) Mk VII guns. Two of these guns were each installed on the roofs of the fore and aft centreline turrets and the wing turrets in unshielded mounts, and the other ten were positioned in the superstructure. All guns were in single mounts. (Note: Sources disagree on the number, type and composition of the secondary armament. Burt gives only eighteen 4-inch guns and claims they were the older quick-firing QF Mark III guns. In addition, he lists a 12-pounder (three-inch (76 mm)) gun. Preston 1972 concurs on the number of 4 inchers, but does not list the 12 pounder. Parkes says twenty 4-inch guns; while not identifying the type, he does say they were 50-calibre guns and Preston agrees. Friedman shows the QF Mark III as a 40-calibre gun and says the 50-calibre BL Mark VII gun armed all the early dreadnoughts.) The ships were also fitted with three 18-inch (450 mm) torpedo tubes, one on each broadside and the third in the stern.

The St Vincent-class ships were protected by a waterline armoured belt 8–10 inches (203–254 mm) thick that extended between the end barbettes. Their decks ranged in thickness between 0.75 to 3 inches (19 to 76 mm) with the thickest portions protecting the steering gear in the stern. The main battery turret faces were 11 inches (279 mm) thick, and the turrets were supported by barbettes 9–10 inches (229–254 mm) thick.

=== Modifications ===
The guns on the forward turret roof were removed in 1910–1911. About three years later, gun shields were fitted to most of the 4-inch guns in the superstructure and the bridge structure was enlarged around the base of the forward tripod mast. During the first year of World War I, the base of the forward superstructure was rebuilt to house eight 4-inch guns and the turret-top guns were removed, which reduced her secondary armament to a total of fourteen guns. In addition a pair of 3-inch (76 mm) anti-aircraft (AA) guns were added. A fire-control director was installed high on the forward tripod mast before the Battle of Jutland in May 1916. Approximately 50 long tons (51 t) of additional deck armour were added afterwards. By April 1917, Vanguard mounted thirteen 4-inch anti-torpedo boat guns as well as one 4-inch and one 3-inch AA gun.

== Construction and career ==
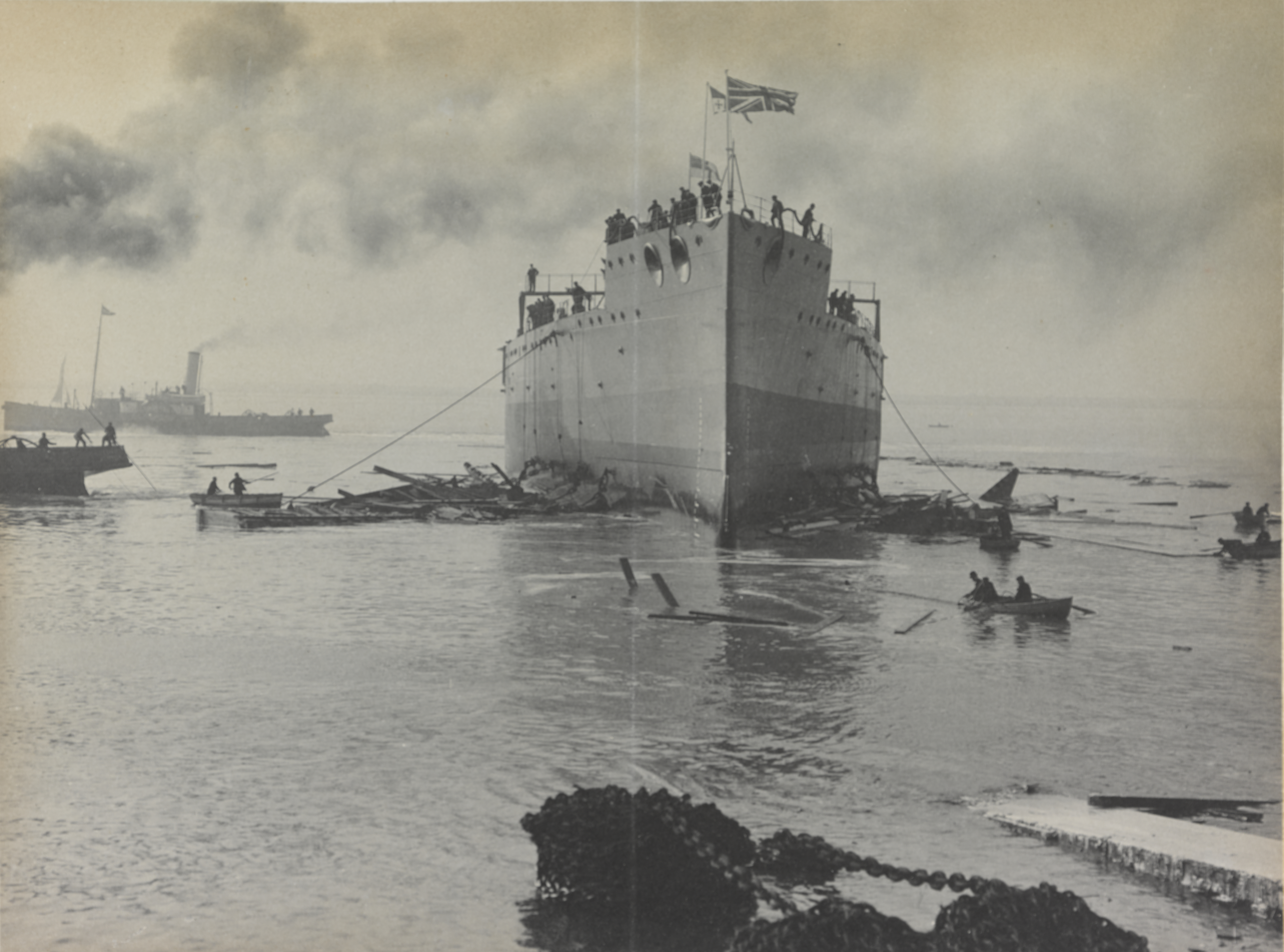
Vanguard just after her launch, 22 February 1909

Vanguard, the eighth ship of that name to serve in the Royal Navy, was ordered on 6 February 1908. She was laid down by Vickers Armstrong at their Barrow-in-Furness shipyard on 2 April 1908, launched on 22 February 1909, and completed on 1 March 1910. Including armament, the ship cost about £1.6 million. (Note: Burt puts the cost at £1,606,030, while Parkes quotes it as £1,607,780.) Vanguard was commissioned on 1 March 1910, under the command of Captain John Eustace, and assigned to the 1st Division of the Home Fleet. She was present in Torbay when King George V visited the fleet in late July. Vanguard also participated in the Coronation Fleet Review at Spithead on 24 June 1911 and she trained with the Atlantic Fleet the following month before beginning a refit. Captain Arthur Ricardo relieved Eustace on 23 September.

The ship was recommissioned on 28 March 1912 and rejoined the 1st Division shortly before it was renamed the 1st Battle Squadron on 1 May. She participated in exercises with the 1st Fleet in October. Vanguard was refitted in December, with new bilge keels being installed. On 5 June 1913, Captain Cecil Hickley replaced Ricardo upon the latter's promotion to commodore, second class.

=== World War I ===
Between 17 and 20 July 1914, Vanguard took part in a test mobilisation and fleet review as part of the British response to the July Crisis. Arriving in Portland on 27 July, she was ordered to proceed with the rest of the Home Fleet to Scapa Flow two days later to forestall a possible surprise attack by the Imperial German Navy. In August 1914, following the outbreak of World War I, the Home Fleet was reorganised as the Grand Fleet, and placed under the command of Admiral John Jellicoe. On 1 September, the Grand Fleet was anchored at Scapa Flow when the light cruiser Falmouth spotted a suspected German submarine, provoking a panic across the fleet. Vanguard also spotted what was believed to be a periscope and opened fire, but the whole incident proved to be a false alarm. Submarine scares such as this caused the fleet to be briefly (22 October to 3 November) based at Lough Swilly, Ireland, while the defences at Scapa were strengthened. On the evening of 22 November, the Grand Fleet conducted a fruitless sweep in the southern half of the North Sea; Vanguard stood with the main body in support of Vice-Admiral David Beatty's 1st Battlecruiser Squadron. The fleet was back in port in Scapa Flow by 27 November. (Note: In his 1919 book, Jellicoe generally only named specific ships when they were undertaking individual actions. Usually he referred to the Grand Fleet as a whole, or by squadrons and, unless otherwise specified, this article assumes that Vanguard is participating in the activities of the Grand Fleet.) The 1st Battle Squadron cruised north-west of the Shetland Islands and exercised their guns on 8–12 December. Four days later, the Grand Fleet sortied during the German raid on Scarborough, Hartlepool and Whitby, but failed to make contact with the High Seas Fleet. Vanguard and the rest of the Grand Fleet made another sweep of the North Sea on 25–27 December.

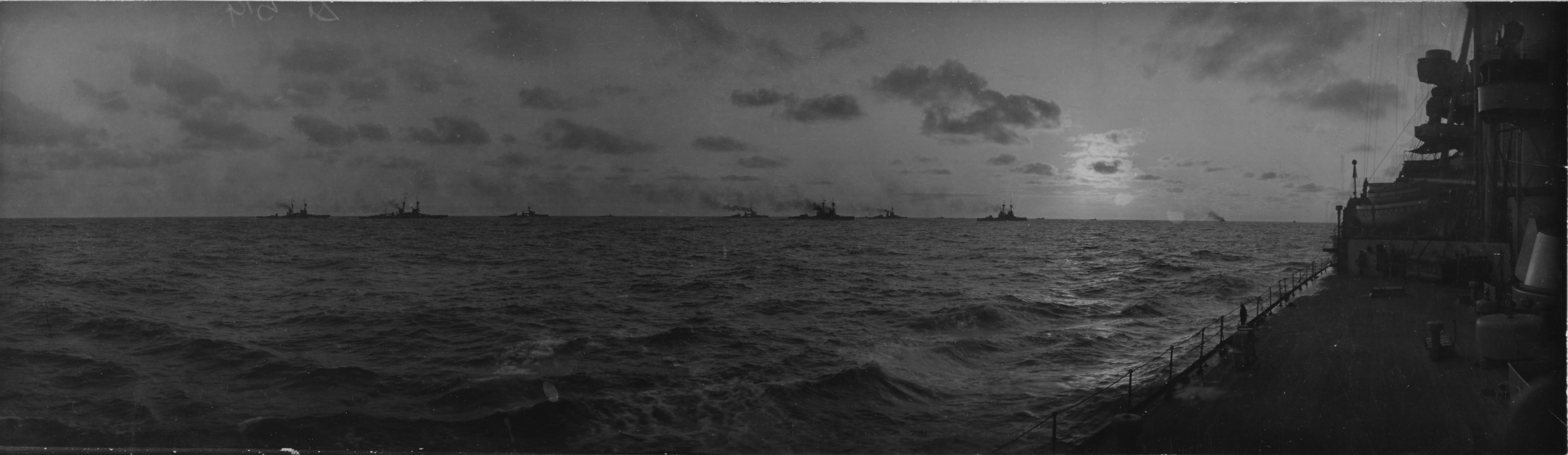
The 1st Battle Squadron at sea, April 1915

Jellicoe's ships, including Vanguard, conducted gunnery drills west of Orkney and Shetland on 10–13 January 1915. On the evening of 23 January, the bulk of the Grand Fleet sailed in support of Beatty's battlecruisers, but they were too far away to participate in the ensuing Battle of Dogger Bank the following day. On 7–10 March, the Grand Fleet made a sweep in the northern North Sea, during which it conducted training manoeuvres. Another such cruise took place on 16–19 March. On 11 April, the fleet patrolled the central North Sea and returned to port on 14 April; another patrol in the area took place on 17–19 April, followed by gunnery drills off Shetland on 20–21 April.

The Grand Fleet swept the central North Sea on 17–19 May and 29–31 May without encountering any German vessels. During 11–14 June the fleet practised gunnery and battle exercises west of Shetland, and on 11 July there was more training off Shetland. On 2–5 September, the fleet went on another cruise in the northern end of the North Sea and conducted gunnery drills. Throughout the rest of the month, the Grand Fleet was performing numerous training exercises before making another sweep into the North Sea on 13–15 October. Almost three weeks later, Vanguard participated in another fleet training operation west of Orkney during 2–5 November.

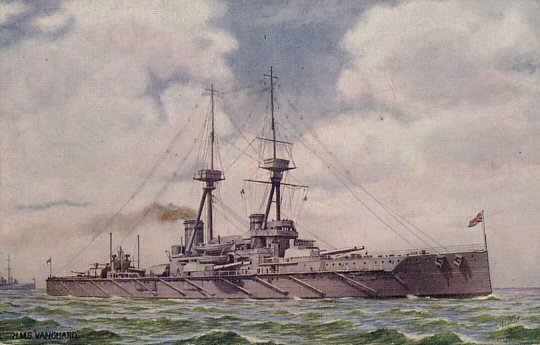
A postcard of Vanguard at sea

Captain James Dick relieved Hickley on 22 January 1916. The fleet departed for a cruise in the North Sea on 26 February; Jellicoe had intended to use the Harwich Force to sweep the Heligoland Bight, but bad weather prevented operations in the southern North Sea. As a result, the operation was confined to the northern end of the sea. Another sweep began on 6 March, but had to be abandoned the following day as the weather grew too severe for the escorting destroyers. On the night of 25 March, Vanguard and the rest of the fleet sailed from Scapa Flow to support Beatty's battlecruisers and other light forces raiding the German Zeppelin base at Tondern. By the time the Grand Fleet approached the area on 26 March, the British and German forces had already disengaged and a strong gale threatened the light craft, so the fleet was ordered to return to base. In April the ship was transferred to the 4th Battle Squadron. On 21 April, the Grand Fleet conducted a demonstration off Horns Reef to distract the Germans while the Russian Navy re-laid its defensive minefields in the Baltic Sea. The fleet returned to Scapa Flow on 24 April and refuelled before proceeding south in response to intelligence reports that the Germans were about to launch a raid on Lowestoft. The Grand Fleet arrived in the area after the Germans had withdrawn. On 2–4 May, the fleet conducted another demonstration off Horns Reef to keep German attention focused on the North Sea.

=== Battle of Jutland ===
Maps showing the manoeuvres of the British (blue) and German (red) fleets on 31 May – 1 June 1916

In an attempt to lure out and destroy a portion of the Grand Fleet, the High Seas Fleet, composed of 16 dreadnoughts, 6 pre-dreadnoughts, and supporting ships, departed the Jade Bight early on the morning of 31 May. The fleet sailed in concert with Rear Admiral Franz von Hipper's five battlecruisers. The Royal Navy's Room 40 had intercepted and decrypted German radio traffic containing plans of the operation. In response the Admiralty ordered the Grand Fleet, totalling some 28 dreadnoughts and 9 battlecruisers, to sortie the night before to cut off and destroy the High Seas Fleet.

During the Battle of Jutland on 31 May, Beatty's battlecruisers managed to bait Scheer and Hipper into a pursuit as they fell back upon the main body of the Grand Fleet. After Jellicoe deployed his ships into line of battle, Vanguard was the eighteenth ship from the head of the battle line after deployment. Shortly after deploying from column into line ahead, her crew recorded that shells from the High Seas Fleet were falling nearby. During the first stage of the general engagement, the ship fired 42 rounds from her main guns at the crippled light cruiser SMS Wiesbaden beginning at 18:32, (Note: The times used in this section are in UT, which is one hour behind CET, which is often used in German works.) claiming several hits. Between 19:20 and 19:30, Vanguard engaged several German destroyer flotillas with her main armament without result. This was the last time that the ship fired her guns during the battle, as the poor visibility hindered Jellicoe's ability to close with the Germans before Scheer was able to disengage under the cover of darkness. Vanguard fired a total of 65 high-explosive and 15 common-pointed, capped, twelve-inch shells and 10 shells from her four-inch guns during the battle.

==== Subsequent activity ====
The Grand Fleet sortied on 18 August to ambush the High Seas Fleet, while it advanced into the southern North Sea, but a series of miscommunications and mistakes prevented Jellicoe from intercepting the German fleet before it returned to port. Two light cruisers were sunk by German U-boats during the operation, prompting Jellicoe to decide to not risk the major units of the fleet south of 55° 30' North due to the prevalence of German submarines and mines. The Admiralty concurred and stipulated that the Grand Fleet would not sortie unless the German fleet was attempting an invasion of Britain or there was a strong possibility it could be forced into an engagement under suitable conditions. Vanguard was refitted in Rosyth in December.

== Explosion ==
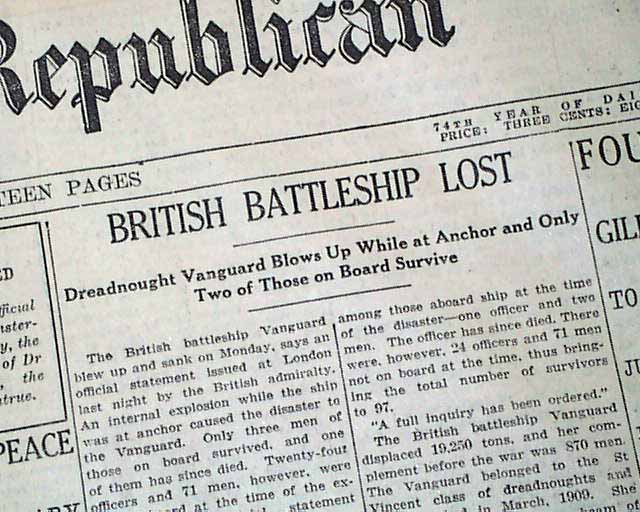
Article on the front page of the Springfield Republican covering the sinking of Vanguard

The ship anchored in Scapa Flow at about 18:30 on 9 July 1917 after having spent the morning exercising general evolutions concluding practising the routine for abandoning ship. The Captain made a speech to the ship's company in which he stated that under present conditions a ship would either blow up in a matter of seconds, or would take several hours to sink. Practically this meant that all would go down with the ship or that everybody would be saved. There is no record of anyone detecting anything amiss until the first detonation at 23:20. Vanguard sank almost instantly, with only three of the crew surviving, one of whom died soon afterwards. A total of 843 men were lost, including two Australian stokers from the light cruiser HMAS Sydney who were serving time in the battleship's brig. Another casualty was Commander Eto Kyōsuke, a military observer from the Imperial Japanese Navy, which was allied with the Royal Navy at the time through the Anglo-Japanese Alliance. The bodies of 17 of the 22 men recovered after the explosion, plus that of Lieutenant Commander Alan Duke, who died after being rescued, were buried at the Royal Naval Cemetery at Lyness, not far from the site of the explosion. The others are commemorated on the Chatham, Plymouth and Portsmouth Naval Memorials.

A Court of Inquiry heard accounts from many witnesses on nearby ships. They accepted the consensus that there had been a small explosion with a white glare between the foremast and 'A' turret, followed after a brief interval by two much larger explosions. The court decided, on the balance of the available evidence, that the main detonations were in either 'P' magazine, 'Q' magazine, or both. A great deal of debris thrown out by the explosions landed on nearby ships; a section of plating measuring approximately six by four feet (1.8 by 1.2 m) landed on board the battleship Bellerophon. It was found to be from the No. 2 Hydraulic Room abaft 'A' barbette. It showed no signs of a blast from 'A' magazine, which reinforced the visual evidence suggesting that the explosion took place in the central part of the ship.

Although the explosion was obviously a detonation of the cordite charges in a main magazine, the reason for it was less clear. There were several theories. The inquiry found that some of the cordite on board, which had been temporarily offloaded in December 1916 and catalogued at that time, was past its stated safe life. The possibility of spontaneous detonation was raised, but could not be proved. It was also noted that a number of ship's boilers were still in use, and some watertight doors, which should have been closed in wartime, were open as the ship was in port. It was suggested that this might have contributed to a dangerously high temperature in the magazines. The final conclusion of the court was that a fire started in a four-inch magazine, perhaps when a raised temperature caused spontaneous ignition of cordite, spreading to one or the other main magazines, which then exploded.

== Wreck ==
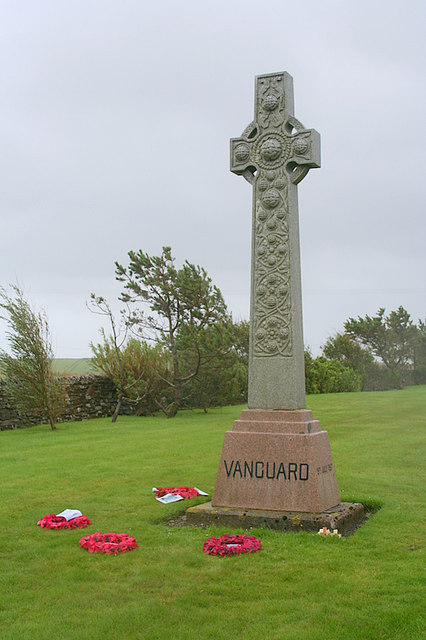
The Vanguard memorial in Lyness

Vanguard's wreck was heavily salvaged in search of non-ferrous metals before it was declared a war grave in 1984. Some of the main armament and armour plate was also removed.

The wreck and its associated debris cover a large area and lies at a depth of approximately 34 metres (111 ft 7 in) at 58.8566°N 3.1062°W. The amidships portion of the ship is almost completely gone and 'P' and 'Q' turrets were blown some 40 metres (130 ft) away. The bow and stern areas are almost intact as has been revealed by an extensive survey, carried out by a team of volunteer specialist divers and authorised by the Ministry of Defence in 2016. A report of the survey was published in April 2018.

The wreck was designated as a controlled site in 2002 and cannot be dived upon except with permission from the Ministry of Defence. The centenary of Vanguard's loss was commemorated on 9 July 2017: descendants of the crew laid 40 wreaths above her wreckage, Royal Navy divers placed a new Union Jack on the wreck, and Lyness Royal Naval Cemetery—where some of the crew were buried—held a wreath-laying ceremony.

In 2025, permission was given for divers to recover the bell, badge and tampion of the ship. The items were successfully recovered in July 2025 and are undergoing specialist conservation. They are intended to become part of new public exhibition at the Scapa Flow Museum.

== See also ==
- List of United Kingdom disasters by death toll

== Bibliography ==
- Brooks, John (1996). "Percy Scott and the Director". In McLean, David & Preston, Antony (eds.). Warship 1996. London: Conway Maritime Press. pp. 150–170. ISBN 0-85177-685-X.
- Brown, David K. (1999). The Grand Fleet: Warship Design and Development 1906–1922. Annapolis, Maryland: Naval Institute Press. ISBN 1-55750-315-X.
- Burt, R. A. (1986). British Battleships of World War One. Annapolis, Maryland: Naval Institute Press. ISBN 978-0-87021-863-7.
- Campbell, N. J. M. (1986). Jutland: An Analysis of the Fighting. Annapolis, Maryland: Naval Institute Press. ISBN 0-87021-324-5.
- Colledge, J. J.; Warlow, Ben (2006) [1969]. Ships of the Royal Navy: The Complete Record of All Fighting Ships of the Royal Navy from the 15th Century to the Present (3rd Rev ed.). London: Chatham Publishing. ISBN 978-1-86176-281-8. OCLC 67375475.
- Corbett, Julian (1997) [1940]. Naval Operations. History of the Great War: Based on Official Documents. Vol. III (Second ed.). London and Nashville, Tennessee: Imperial War Museum in association with the Battery Press. ISBN 1-870423-50-X.
- Friedman, Norman (2011). Naval Weapons of World War One: Guns, Torpedoes, Mines and ASW Weapons of All Nations; An Illustrated Directory. Barnsley, UK: Seaforth Publishing. ISBN 978-1-84832-100-7.
- Halpern, Paul G. (1995). A Naval History of World War I. Annapolis, Maryland: Naval Institute Press. ISBN 1-55750-352-4.
- Jellicoe, John (1919). The Grand Fleet, 1914–1916: Its Creation, Development, and Work. New York: George H. Doran Company. OCLC 13614571.
- Massie, Robert K. (2003). Castles of Steel: Britain, Germany, and the Winning of the Great War at Sea. New York: Random House. ISBN 0-679-45671-6.
- Monograph No. 12: The Action of Dogger Bank – 24th January 1915 (PDF). Naval Staff Monographs (Historical). Vol. III. The Naval Staff, Training and Staff Duties Division. 1921. pp. 209–226. OCLC 220734221.
- Monograph No. 24: Home Waters – Part II: September and October 1914 (PDF). Naval Staff Monographs (Historical). Vol. XI. The Naval Staff, Training and Staff Duties Division. 1924. OCLC 220734221.
- Parkes, Oscar (1990) [1966]. British Battleships, Warrior 1860 to Vanguard 1950: A History of Design, Construction, and Armament (New & rev. ed.). Annapolis, Maryland: Naval Institute Press. ISBN 1-55750-075-4.
- Preston, Antony (1972). Battleships of World War I: An Illustrated Encyclopedia of the Battleships of All Nations 1914–1918. New York: Galahad Books. ISBN 0-88365-300-1.
- Preston, Antony (1985). "Great Britain and Empire Forces". In Gray, Randal (ed.). Conway's All the World's Fighting Ships 1906–1921. Annapolis, Maryland: Naval Institute Press. pp. 1–104. ISBN 0-85177-245-5.
- Schleihauf, William (July 2000). "Disaster in Harbour: The Loss of HMS Vanguard" (PDF). The Northern Mariner. X (3): 57–89. doi:10.25071/2561-5467.619.
- Tarrant, V. E. (1999) [1995]. Jutland: The German Perspective: A New View of the Great Battle, 31 May 1916. London: Brockhampton Press. ISBN 1-86019-917-8.
