= List of ship commissionings in 1912 =

The list of ship commissionings in 1912 is a chronological list of ships commissioned in 1912. In cases where no official commissioning ceremony was held, the date of service entry may be used instead.

Date	Operator	Ship	Flag	Class and type	Pennant	Other notes
2 January	Royal Navy	Orion		Orion-class battleship		
12 January	Royal Netherlands Navy	Hydra		Hydra-class minelayer		
10 April	White Star Line	Titanic		Passenger/cargo steamer		Sunk by Iceberg on April 15, 1912
27 April	Royal Navy	Monarch		Orion-class battleship		
1 May	Imperial German Navy	Oldenburg		Helgoland-class battleship		
4 June	Royal Navy	Lion		Lion-class battlecruiser		
15 June	Royal Navy	Thunderer		Orion-class battleship		
2 July	Imperial German Navy	Goeben		Moltke-class battlecruiser		
1 August	Imperial German Navy	Kaiser		Kaiser-class battleship		
12 August	Hamburg-Sudamerikanische DG	Monte Penedo		General cargo vessel		
20 August	Imperial German Navy	Magdeburg		Magdeburg-class cruiser		
20 August	Imperial German Navy	Breslau		Magdeburg-class cruiser		
17 September	United States Navy	Arkansas		Wyoming-class battleship	BB-33	
25 September	United States Navy	Wyoming		Wyoming-class battleship	BB-32	
9 October	Imperial German Navy	Strassburg		Magdeburg-class cruiser		
15 October	Imperial German Navy	Friedrich der Grosse		Kaiser-class battleship		
14 November	Royal Navy	Princess Royal		Lion-class battlecruiser		
16 November	Royal Navy	King George V		King George V-class battleship		
19 November	Royal Navy	New Zealand		Indefatigable-class battlecruiser		
23 November	Royal Navy	Conqueror		Orion-class battleship		
5 December	Austro-Hungarian Navy	Viribus Unitis		Tegetthoff-class battleship		
10 December	Imperial German Navy	Stralsund		Magdeburg-class cruiser		
