= George Borrett =

Royal Navy Admiral (1868–1952)

Admiral George Borrett CB
- Born: 10 March 1868; Wimbledon, United Kingdom
- Died: 10 June 1952 (aged 84)
- Military career
- Allegiance: United Kingdom
- Branch: (United Kingdom) Royal Navy
- Service years: 1881 – 1925/27
- Rank: Admiral
- Commands: See Ships commanded
- Conflicts: First World War
- Awards: Most Honourable Order of the Bath

Admiral George Holmes Borrett, CB (10 March 1868 – 10 June 1952) was an officer of the Royal Navy. He served during the First World War, commanding a battleship at the Battle of Jutland, and later rising to the rank of admiral.

== Early life ==
George Borrett was born on 10 March 1868 in Wimbledon to George Tuthill Borrett. He joined the competitive examinations for cadetships in the Royal Navy on 15 July 1889 and he was one of the best of the class, making him a Naval Cadet. He later married Clare Louisa daughter of William Guyer Hunter and had one daughter named Ellen.

== Naval career ==
Borrrett was promoted to sub-lieutenant on 13 November 1887, and again on 13 November 1889, to lieutenant. He was promoted to commander on 1 January 1901 for services in China, and in June the following year was posted to the signals school at HMS Victory. He served at Victory during the coronation fleet review on 16 August 1902. From 1 September 1902 he was posted to the pre-dreadnought battleship HMS Revenge, which became flagship of the Home Fleet the following month. In February 1903 he was posted to HMS President as an advisor on torpedoes for ships building at contractors.

While in command of HMS Pioneer, he was promoted to captain on 31 December 1906. Borrett served during the First World War, commanding the battleship HMS Monarch at the Battle of Jutland in 1916. For his actions during the war, he was appointed a Companion of the Order of the Bath (CB) on 1 January 1918. He would finally become rear-admiral on 16 August 1918 and vice-admiral on 14 October 1923, before retiring after achieving the rank of admiral on 1 August 1927.

== Later life ==
After the war, Borrett stayed in the Navy and received further promotions. On 17 February 1925 he was placed at his own request on the retired list, though he remained in the navy until 1927. When he was finally promoted to Admiral on 1 August 1927, he fully retired from naval service.

He died on 10 June 1952 at the age of 84, after a career of 46 years in the Navy.

== Ships commanded ==
Preceded by George P. W. Hope	Captain of HMS Pioneer; 29 August 1904 – 9 January 1907	Succeeded by Charles B. Miller
Preceded by Philip Nelson-Ward	Captain of HMS Indefatigable; 1 January 1908 – 25 January 1910	Succeeded by ?
Preceded by Arthur W. Ewart	Captain of HMS Ramillies; 18 April 1910 – 24 February 1911	Succeeded by ?
Preceded by Bertram M. Chambers	Captain of HMS Majestic; 24 February 1911 – 20 September 1912	Succeeded by Guy R. A. Gaunt
Preceded by Lionel Halsey	Captain of HMS Donegal; 20 September 1912 – 25 August 1913	Succeeded by Cunningham R. de C. Foot
Preceded by James A. Fergusson	Captain of HMS Warrior; 25 August 1913 – 16 December 1915	Succeeded by Vincent B. Molteno
Preceded by Frederick L. Field	Captain of HMS Monarch; 16 December 1915 – 15 March 1916	Succeeded by Michael H. Hodges
Preceded by Michael H. Hodges	Captain of HMS Monarch; April 1916 – 6 April 1918	Succeeded by Sidney R. Drury-Lowe
Preceded by New Command	Rear-Admiral Commanding, Seventh Light Cruiser Squadron; 6 April 1918 – 28 February 1919	Succeeded by Command Abolished
Preceded by Reginald Y. Tyrwhitt	Rear-Admiral Commanding, Harwich Force; 1 March 1919	Succeeded by ?
Preceded by Alfred A. Ellison	Senior Naval Officer, Yangtze; May 1920 – October 1921	Succeeded by Crawford Maclachlan

== Bibliography ==
- "Admiral G. H. Borrett" (Obituaries). The Times. Wednesday, 11 June 1952. Issue 52335, col D, p. 8.
