= HMS Monarch (1911) =

Royal Navy battleship

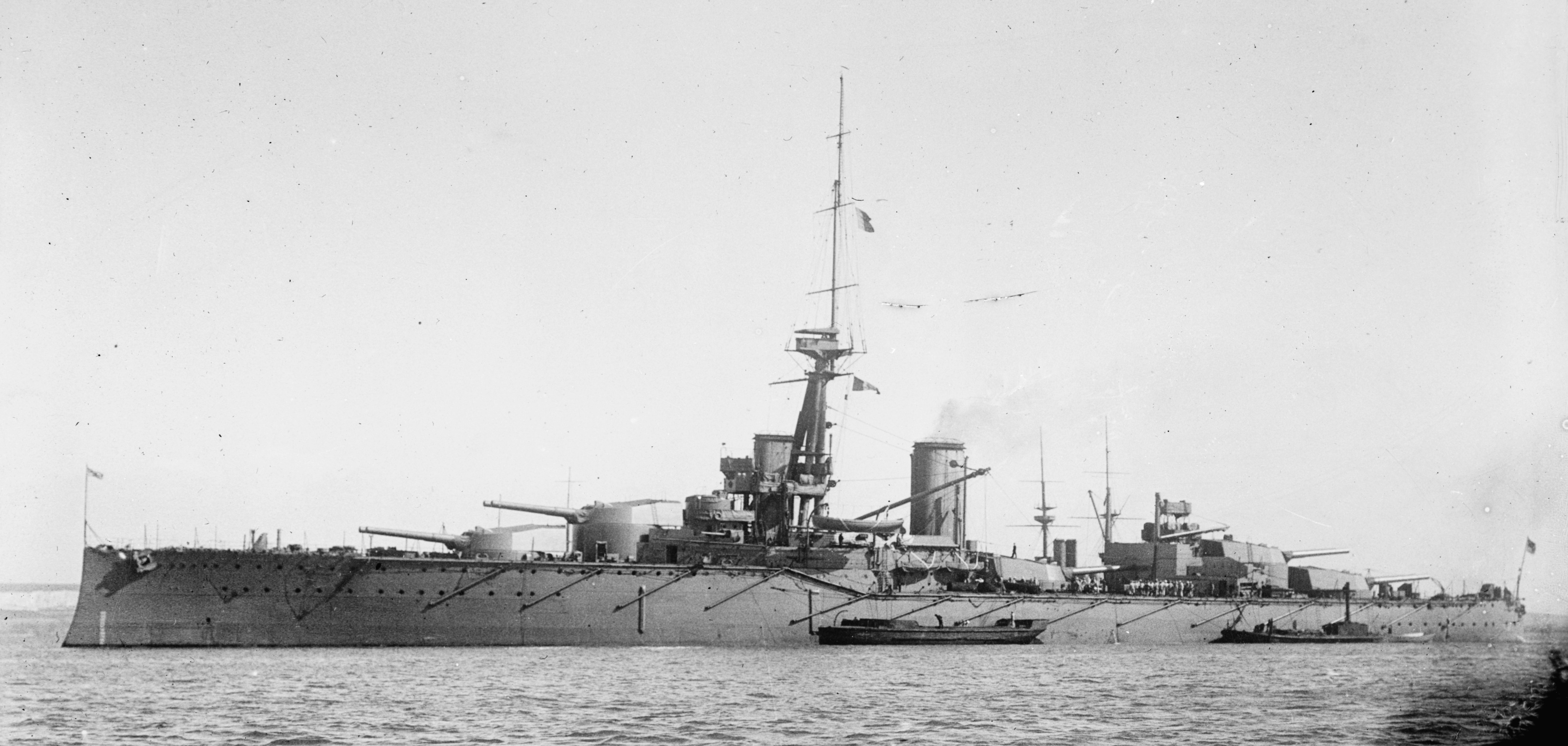
- Monarch at anchor, before 1915

History

United Kingdom
- Name: Monarch
- Namesake: A French ship, Monarque, captured in 1747
- Builder: Armstrong Whitworth, Elswick
- Laid down: 1 April 1910
- Launched: 30 March 1911
- Commissioned: 27 April 1912
- Decommissioned: 5 May 1922
- Out of service: October 1923
- Fate: Sunk as a target, 20 January 1925

General characteristics (as built)
- Class & type: Orion-class dreadnought battleship
- Displacement: 21,922 long tons (22,274 t) (normal)
- Length: 581 ft (177.1 m) (o/a)
- Beam: 88 ft 6 in (27.0 m)
- Draught: 31 ft 3 in (9.5 m)
- Installed power: 27,000 shp (20,000 kW); 18 × Yarrow boilers
- Propulsion: 4 × shafts; 2 × steam turbine sets
- Speed: 21 knots (39 km/h; 24 mph)
- Range: 6,730 nmi (12,460 km; 7,740 mi) at 10 knots (19 km/h; 12 mph)
- Complement: 738–750 (1914)
- Armament: 5 × twin 13.5-inch (343 mm) guns; 16 × single 4-inch (102 mm) guns; 3 × 21-inch (533 mm) torpedo tubes
- Armour: Belt: 8–12 in (203–305 mm); Deck: 1–4 inches (25–102 mm); Turrets: 11 in (280 mm); Barbettes: 10 in (254 mm)

HMS Monarch was the second of four Orion-class dreadnought battleships built for the Royal Navy in the early 1910s. She spent the bulk of her career assigned to the Home and Grand Fleets. Aside from participating in the failed attempt to intercept the German ships that had bombarded Scarborough, Hartlepool and Whitby in late 1914, the Battle of Jutland in May 1916 and the inconclusive action of 19 August, her service during World War I generally consisted of routine patrols and training in the North Sea.

After the Grand Fleet was dissolved in early 1919, Monarch was transferred back to the Home Fleet for a few months before she was assigned to the Reserve Fleet. The ship was listed for disposal in mid-1922, but was hulked for use as a stationary training ship. In late 1923 Monarch was converted into a target ship and sunk in early 1925.

== Design and description ==
The Orion-class ships were designed in response to the beginning of the Anglo-German naval arms race and were much larger than their predecessors of the Colossus-class battleship to accommodate larger, more powerful guns and heavier armour. In recognition of these improvements, the class was sometimes called "super-dreadnoughts". The ships had an overall length of 581 feet (177.1 m), a beam of 88 feet 6 inches (27.0 m) and a deep draught of 31 feet 3 inches (9.5 m). They displaced 21,922 long tons (22,274 t) at normal load and 25,596 long tons (26,007 t) at deep load as built; by 1918 Monarch's deep displacement had increased to 28,556 long tons (29,014 t). Her crew numbered 738 officers and ratings upon completion and 750 as of 1914.

The Orion class was powered by two sets of Parsons direct-drive steam turbines, each driving two shafts, using steam provided by 18 Yarrow boilers. The turbines were rated at 27,000 shaft horsepower (20,000 kW) and were intended to give the battleships a speed of 21 knots (39 km/h; 24 mph). During her sea trials on 9 December 1911, Monarch reached a maximum speed of 21.9 knots (40.6 km/h; 25.2 mph) from 32,277 shp (24,069 kW). The ships carried enough coal and fuel oil to give them a range of 6,730 nautical miles (12,460 km; 7,740 mi) at a cruising speed of 10 knots (19 km/h; 12 mph).

=== Armament and armour ===
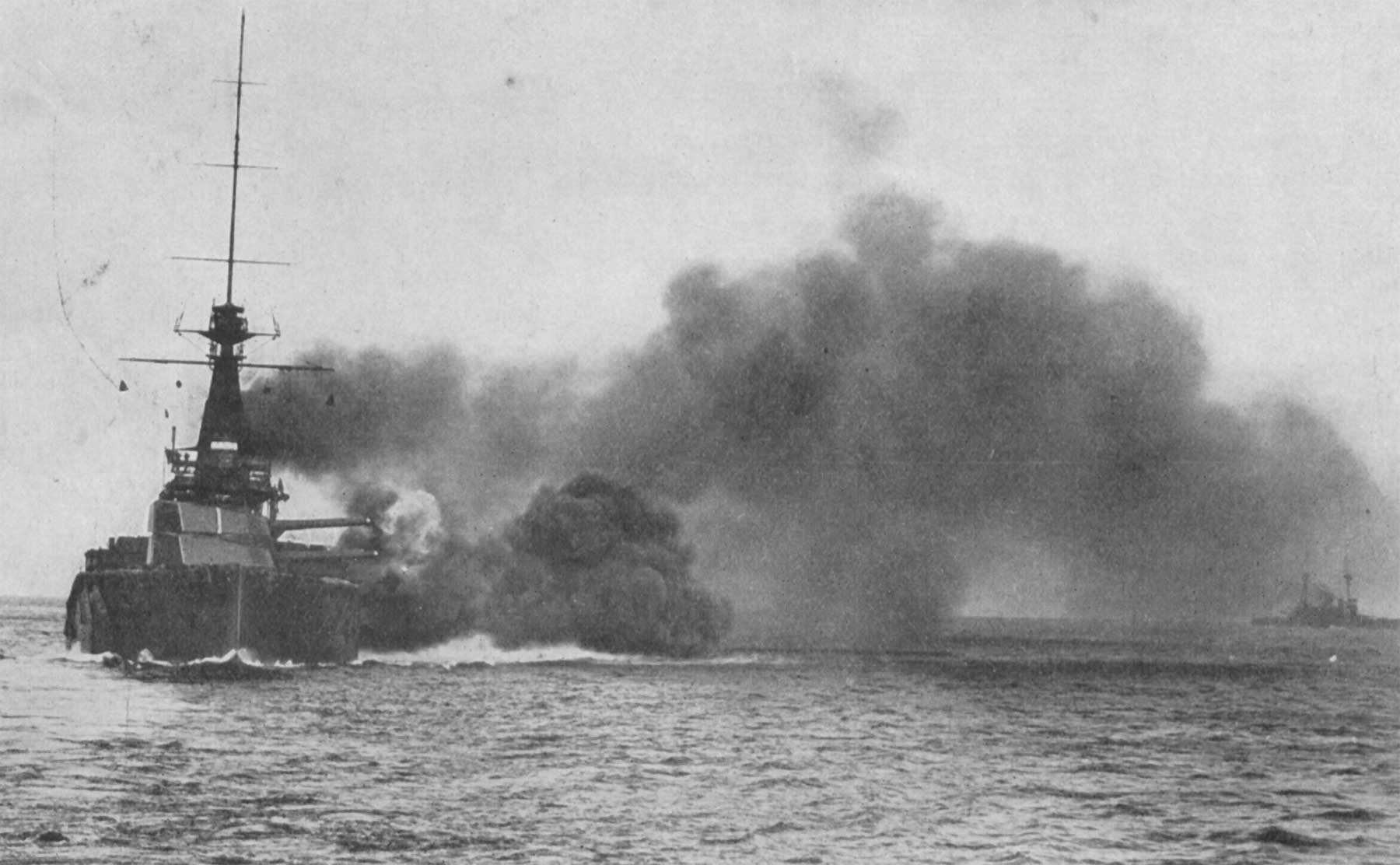
Monarch firing her main battery, before 1915

The Orion class was equipped with 10 breech-loading (BL) 13.5-inch (343 mm) Mark V guns in five hydraulically powered twin-gun turrets, all on the centreline. The turrets were designated 'A', 'B', 'Q', 'X' and 'Y', from front to rear. Their secondary armament consisted of 16 BL 4-inch (102 mm) Mark VII guns. These guns were split evenly between the forward and aft superstructure, all in single mounts. Four 3-pounder (1.9 in (47 mm)) saluting guns were also carried. The ships were equipped with three 21-inch (533 mm) submerged torpedo tubes, one on each broadside and another in the stern, for which 20 torpedoes were provided.

The Orions were protected by a waterline 12-inch (305 mm) armoured belt that extended between the end barbettes. Their decks ranged in thickness between 1 inch (25 mm) and 4 inches with the thickest portions protecting the steering gear in the stern. The main battery turret faces were 11 inches (279 mm) thick, and the turrets were supported by 10-inch-thick (254 mm) barbettes.

=== Modifications ===
In 1914 the shelter-deck guns were enclosed in casemates and a fire-control director was installed sometime in 1914, before August, on a platform below the spotting top. By October 1914, a pair of 3-inch (76 mm) anti-aircraft (AA) guns had been installed. Additional deck armour was added after the Battle of Jutland in May 1916. Around the same time, three 4-inch guns were removed from the aft superstructure and the ship was modified to operate kite balloons. A flying-off platform was mounted on 'B' turret's roof and extended onto the gun barrels during 1917–1918. A high-angle rangefinder was fitted in the forward superstructure by 1921.

== Construction and career ==
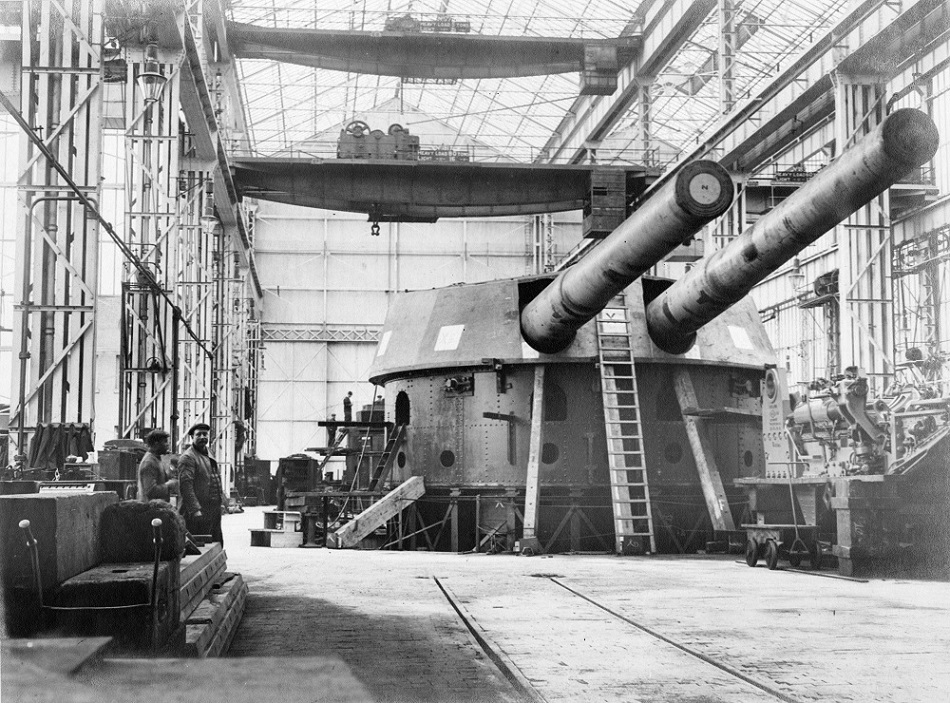
A gun turret, probably one of Monarch's, in the Elswick shipyard, c. 1911

Monarch, named after a third-rate ship of the line, Monarque, that had been captured from the French in 1747, was the third ship of her name to serve in the Royal Navy. The ship was laid down by Armstrong Whitworth at their shipyard in Elswick on 1 April 1910 and launched on 30 March 1911. She was completed on 31 March 1912, commissioned with a partial crew on 16 April and fully commissioned on 27 April. Including her armament, her cost is variously quoted at £1,888,736 or £1,886,912. Monarch was assigned to the 2nd division of the Home Fleet which was redesignated as the 2nd Battle Squadron (BS) on 1 May. The ship, together with her sister ships Thunderer and Orion, participated in the Parliamentary Naval Review on 9 July at Spithead. They then participated in training manoeuvres. The three sisters were present with the 2nd BS to receive the President of France, Raymond Poincaré, at Spithead on 24 June 1913 and then participated in the annual fleet manoeuvres in August.

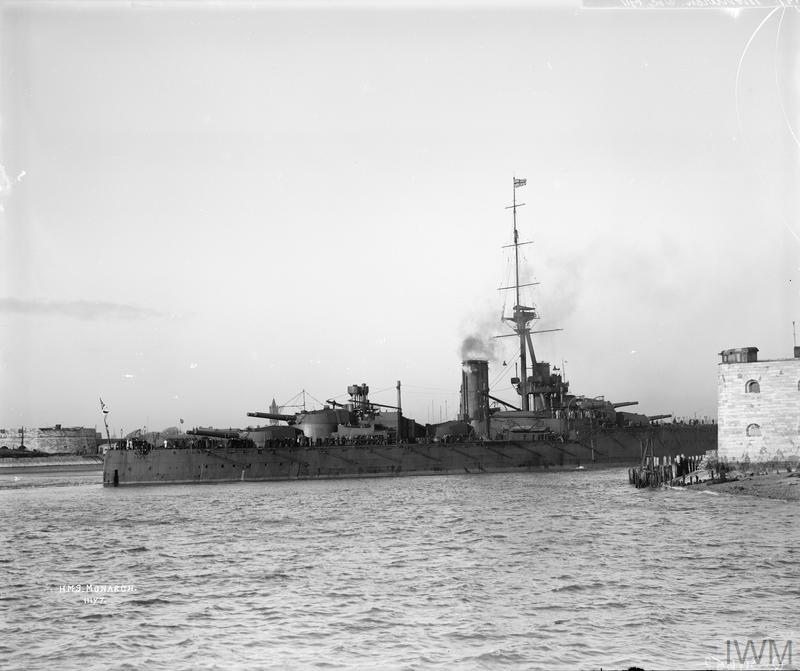
Monarch entering Portsmouth harbour, 1913

=== World War I ===
Between 17 and 20 July 1914, Monarch took part in a test mobilisation and fleet review as part of the British response to the July Crisis. Arriving in Portland on 25 July, she was ordered to proceed with the rest of the Home Fleet to Scapa Flow four days later to safeguard the fleet from a possible surprise attack by the Imperial German Navy. Following the outbreak of World War I in August, the Home Fleet was reorganised as the Grand Fleet, and placed under the command of Admiral Sir John Jellicoe. On 8 August, Monarch was conducting gunnery practice south-east of Fair Isle when she was unsuccessfully attacked by a submarine-fired torpedo. This was probably a false alarm as the area was too far to the west of the German U-boats' patrol zones to be likely. SM U-15, however, has been suggested as a candidate for the attack, although the boat was sunk the following day with the loss of all hands and the truth will never be known.

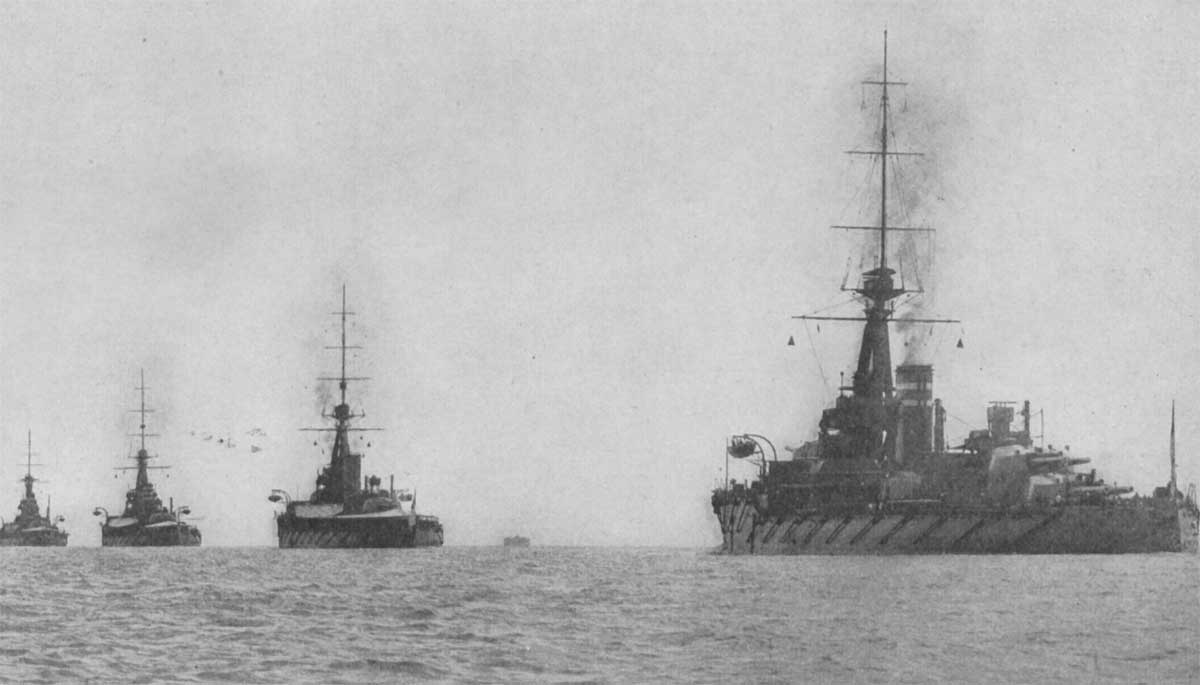
The 2nd BS sailing through the Solent, about 1914. From left to right, King George V, Thunderer, Monarch, and Conqueror

Repeated reports of submarines in Scapa Flow led Jellicoe to conclude that the defences there were inadequate and he ordered that the Grand Fleet be dispersed to other bases until the defences be reinforced. On 16 October the 2nd BS was sent to Loch na Keal on the western coast of Scotland. The squadron departed for gunnery practice off the northern coast of Ireland on the morning of 27 October and the dreadnought Audacious struck a mine, laid a few days earlier by the German armed merchant cruiser SS Berlin. Thinking that the ship had been torpedoed by a submarine, the other dreadnoughts were ordered away from the area, while smaller ships rendered assistance. On the evening of 22 November 1914, the Grand Fleet conducted a fruitless sweep in the southern half of the North Sea; Monarch stood with the main body in support of Vice-Admiral David Beatty's 1st Battlecruiser Squadron. The fleet was back in port in Scapa Flow by 27 November.

==== Bombardment of Scarborough, Hartlepool, and Whitby ====
The Royal Navy's Room 40 had intercepted and decrypted German radio traffic containing plans for a German attack on Scarborough, Hartlepool and Whitby in mid-December using the four battlecruisers of Konteradmiral (Rear-Admiral) Franz von Hipper's I Scouting Group. The radio messages did not mention that the High Seas Fleet with fourteen dreadnoughts and eight pre-dreadnoughts would reinforce Hipper. The ships of both sides departed their bases on 15 December, with the British intending to ambush the German ships on their return voyage. They mustered the six dreadnoughts of Vice-Admiral Sir George Warrender's 2nd BS, including Monarch and her sister ships, Orion and Conqueror, and Beatty's four battlecruisers.

The screening forces of each side blundered into each other during the early morning darkness and heavy weather of 16 December. The Germans got the better of the initial exchange of fire, severely damaging several British destroyers, but Admiral Friedrich von Ingenohl, commander of the High Seas Fleet, ordered his ships to turn away, concerned about the possibility of a massed attack by British destroyers in the dawn's light. A series of miscommunications and mistakes by the British allowed Hipper's ships to avoid an engagement with Beatty's forces.

==== 1915–1916 ====
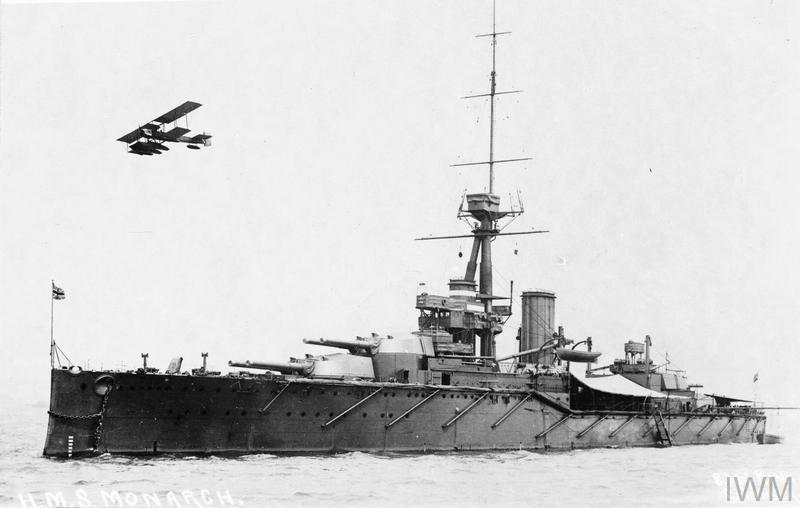
Monarch in the Portsmouth area, a Short Type 184 overhead

The Grand Fleet conducted another fruitless sweep of the North Sea in late December and, while trying to enter Scapa Flow in a Force 8 gale and minimal visibility, Monarch was accidentally rammed by Conqueror on 27 December. The former had to unexpectedly manoeuvre to avoid a guardship at the entrance and Conqueror could not avoid her. Monarch suffered moderate damage to her stern and received temporary repairs at Scapa before proceeding to Devonport for full repairs on 4 January 1915, rejoining the Grand Fleet on 20 January.

On the evening of 23 January, the bulk of the Grand Fleet sailed in support of Beatty's battlecruisers, but Monarch and the rest of the fleet did not participate in the ensuing Battle of Dogger Bank the following day. On 7–10 March, the Grand Fleet conducted a sweep in the northern North Sea, during which it conducted training manoeuvres. Another such cruise took place on 16–19 March. On 11 April, the Grand Fleet conducted a patrol in the central North Sea and returned to port on 14 April; another patrol in the area took place on 17–19 April, followed by gunnery drills off Shetland on 20–21 April.

The Grand Fleet conducted sweeps into the central North Sea on 17–19 May and 29–31 May without encountering any German vessels. During 11–14 June, the fleet conducted gunnery practice and battle exercises west of Shetland and more training off Shetland beginning on 11 July. The 2nd BS conducted gunnery practice in the Moray Firth on 2 August and then returned to Scapa Flow. On 2–5 September, the fleet went on another cruise in the northern end of the North Sea and conducted gunnery drills. Throughout the rest of the month, the Grand Fleet conducted numerous training exercises. The ship, together with the majority of the Grand Fleet, conducted another sweep into the North Sea from 13 to 15 October. Almost three weeks later, Monarch participated in another fleet training operation west of Orkney during 2–5 November and repeated the exercise at the beginning of December.

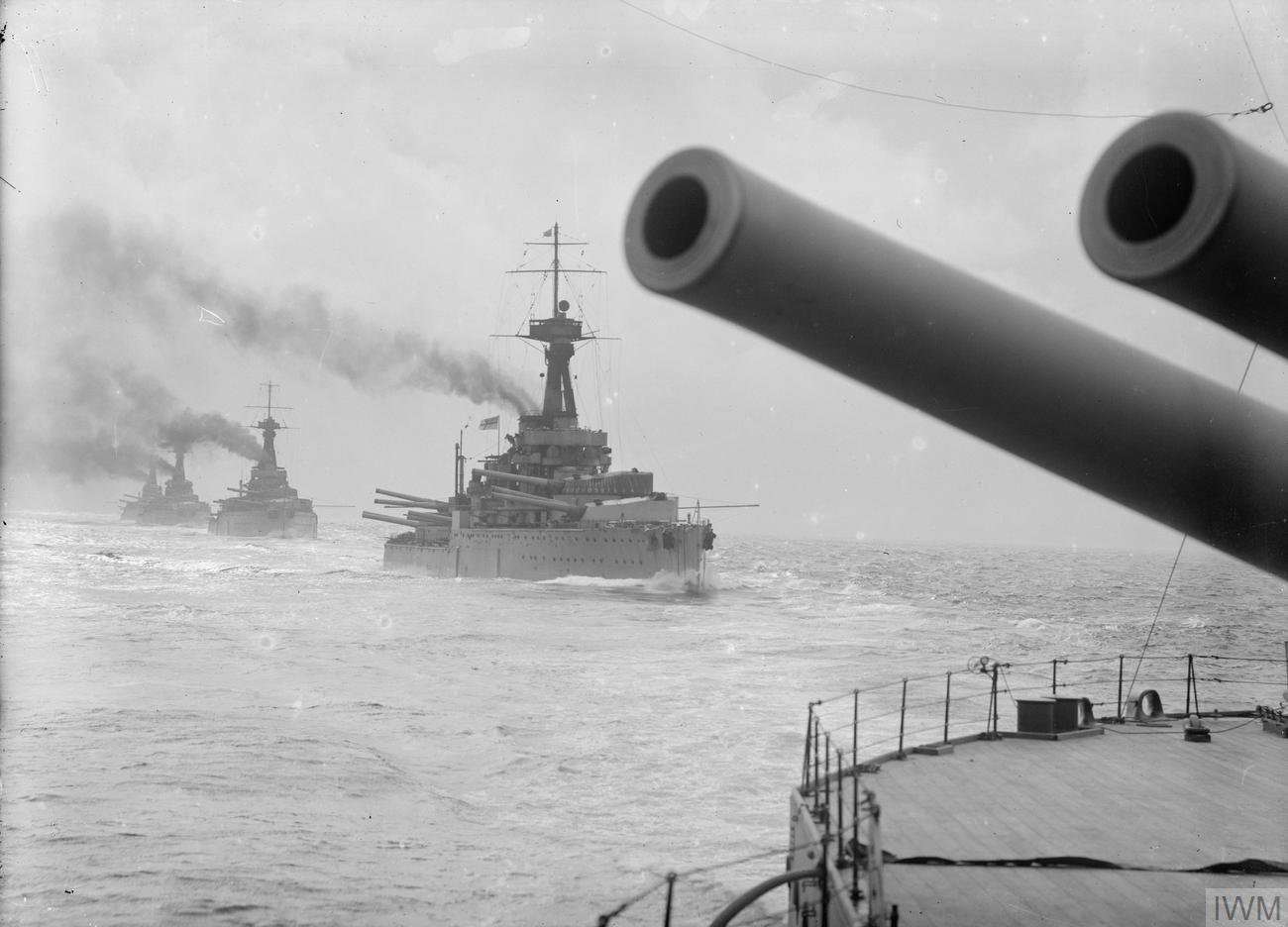
The four Orion-class battleships in line ahead formation, after 1915

The Grand Fleet sortied in response to an attack by German ships on British light forces near Dogger Bank on 10 February 1916, but it was recalled two days later when it became clear that no German ships larger than a destroyer were involved. The fleet departed for a cruise in the North Sea on 26 February; Jellicoe had intended to use the Harwich Force to sweep the Heligoland Bight, but bad weather prevented operations in the southern North Sea. As a result, the operation was confined to the northern end of the sea. Another sweep began on 6 March, but had to be abandoned the following day as the weather grew too severe for the escorting destroyers. On the night of 25 March, Monarch and the rest of the fleet sailed from Scapa Flow to support Beatty's battlecruisers and other light forces raiding the German Zeppelin base at Tondern. By the time the Grand Fleet approached the area on 26 March, the British and German forces had already disengaged and a strong gale threatened the light craft, so the fleet was ordered to return to base. On 21 April, the Grand Fleet conducted a demonstration off Horns Reef to distract the Germans while the Imperial Russian Navy relaid its defensive minefields in the Baltic Sea. The fleet returned to Scapa Flow on 24 April and refuelled before proceeding south in response to intelligence reports that the Germans were about to launch a raid on Lowestoft, but only arrived in the area after the Germans had withdrawn. On 2–4 May, the fleet conducted another demonstration off Horns Reef to keep German attention focused on the North Sea.

==== Battle of Jutland ====
Maps showing the manoeuvres of the British (blue) and German (red) fleets on 31 May – 1 June 1916

In an attempt to lure out and destroy a portion of the Grand Fleet, the High Seas Fleet, composed of sixteen dreadnoughts, six pre-dreadnoughts and supporting ships, departed the Jade Bight early on the morning of 31 May. The fleet sailed in concert with Hipper's five battlecruisers. Room 40 had intercepted and decrypted German radio traffic containing plans of the operation. In response the Admiralty ordered the Grand Fleet, totalling some 28 dreadnoughts and 9 battlecruisers, to sortie the night before to cut off and destroy the High Seas Fleet.

On 31 May, Monarch, under the command of Captain George Borrett, was the sixth ship from the head of the battle line after deployment. During the first stage of the general engagement, the ship fired three salvos of armour-piercing, capped (APC) shells from her main guns at a group of five battleships at 18:32, scoring one hit on the dreadnought SMS König that knocked out a 15-centimetre (5.9 in) gun, temporarily disabled three boilers and started several small fires. (Note: The times used in this section are in UT, which is one hour behind CET, which is often used in German works.) At 19:14, she engaged the battlecruiser SMS Lützow at a range of 17,300–18,450 yards (15,820–16,870 m) with five salvos of APC shells and claimed to straddle her with the last two salvos. Lützow was also fired at by Orion during this time and was hit five times between the sisters. They knocked out two of her main guns, temporarily knocked out the power to the sternmost turret and caused a fair amount of flooding. This was the last time that Monarch fired her guns during the battle, having expended a total of fifty-three 13.5-inch APC shells.

==== Subsequent activity ====
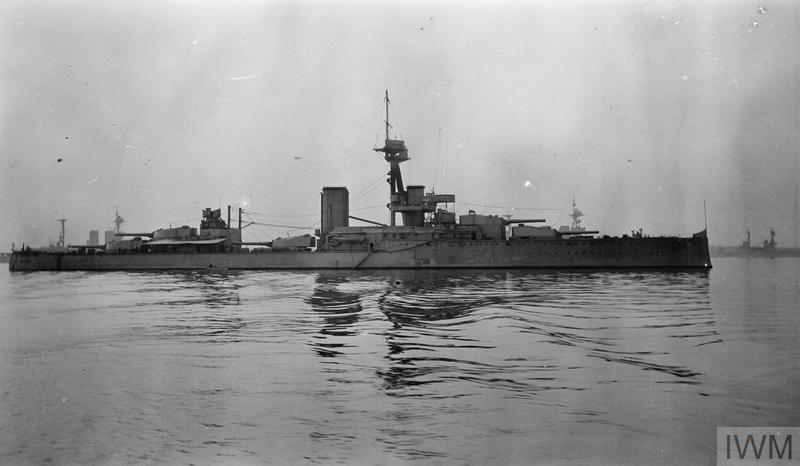
Monarch at anchor in Scapa Flow, June 1917

The Grand Fleet sortied on 18 August to ambush the High Seas Fleet while it advanced into the southern North Sea, but a series of miscommunications and mistakes prevented Jellicoe from intercepting the German fleet before it returned to port. Two light cruisers were sunk by German U-boats during the operation, prompting Jellicoe to decide to not risk the major units of the fleet south of 55° 30' North due to the prevalence of German submarines and mines. The Admiralty concurred and stipulated that the Grand Fleet would not sortie unless the German fleet was attempting an invasion of Britain or there was a strong possibility it could be forced into an engagement under suitable conditions.

In April 1918, the High Seas Fleet again sortied, to attack British convoys to Norway. They enforced strict wireless silence during the operation, which prevented Room 40 cryptanalysts from warning the new commander of the Grand Fleet, Admiral Beatty. The British only learned of the operation after an accident aboard the battlecruiser SMS Moltke forced her to break radio silence to inform the German commander of her condition. Beatty then ordered the Grand Fleet to sea to intercept the Germans, but he was not able to reach the High Seas Fleet before it turned back for Germany. The ship was present at Rosyth, Scotland, when the High Seas Fleet surrendered there on 21 November and she remained part of the 2nd BS through 1 March 1919.

By 1 May, Monarch had been assigned to the 3rd BS of the Home Fleet. On 1 November, the 3rd BS was disbanded and Monarch was transferred to the Reserve Fleet at Portland, together with her sisters. The ship had been transferred back to Portsmouth by 18 March 1920. She was temporarily recommissioned during the summers of 1920 and 1921 to ferry troops to the Mediterranean and back. On 5 May 1922, Monarch was paid off and placed on the disposal list in accordance with the terms of the Washington Naval Treaty. Put up for sale in August, the ship was later withdrawn and attached to the gunnery school at Vernon as a hulk.

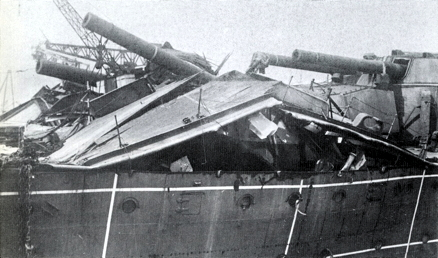
Monarch's forward turrets after she was used as a target ship

Monarch was paid off on 13 June 1923 and she was converted into a target ship at HM Dockyard, Portsmouth in October 1923. A replica of the underwater side protection of the Nelson-class battleships added to test the blast effects of large bombs detonating alongside the hull. A device consisting of 2,081 pounds (944 kg) of TNT (representing the explosives in a 4,000-pound (1,800 kg) aerial bomb) was exploded at a depth of 40 feet (12.2 m) and 7 feet 6 inches (2.3 m) from her side. Although damaged, the structure remained watertight after the test. The following year, live bombs of various sizes were dropped on the ship by Airco DH.9A bombers with little effect. Bombs were then positioned and detonated internally to evaluate their effects. On 20 January 1925, Monarch was towed out from Plymouth by dockyard tugs into Hurd's Deep in the English Channel, approximately 50 nautical miles (93 km; 58 mi) south of the Isles of Scilly. She was attacked by a wave of Royal Air Force bombers, which scored several hits; this was followed by four C-class light cruisers firing six-inch (152-mm) shells, and the destroyer Vectis, using her 4-inch guns. For the finale, the fast battleships Hood and Repulse and the five Revenge-class battleships opened fire with their 15-inch (381-mm) guns. The number of hits on Monarch is unknown, but after nine hours of shelling she finally sank at 22:00 after a final hit by Revenge.

== Bibliography ==
- Brown, David K. (2000). Nelson to Vanguard: Warship Design and Development 1923–1945. London: Chatham Publishing. ISBN 1-55750-492-X.
- Burt, R. A. (1986). British Battleships of World War One. Annapolis, Maryland: Naval Institute Press. ISBN 0-87021-863-8.
- Campbell, N. J. M. (1986). Jutland: An Analysis of the Fighting. Annapolis, Maryland: Naval Institute Press. ISBN 0-87021-324-5.
- Colledge, J. J.; Warlow, Ben (2006) [1969]. Ships of the Royal Navy: The Complete Record of All Fighting Ships of the Royal Navy from the 15th Century to the Present (3rd Rev ed.). London: Chatham Publishing. ISBN 978-1-86176-281-8. OCLC 67375475.
- Corbett, Julian (1997). Naval Operations. History of the Great War: Based on Official Documents. Vol. III (reprint of the 1940 second ed.). London and Nashville, Tennessee: Imperial War Museum in association with the Battery Press. ISBN 1-870423-50-X.
- Friedman, Norman (2015). The British Battleship 1906–1946. Barnsley, UK: Seaforth Publishing. ISBN 978-1-84832-225-7.
- Goldrick, James (2015). Before Jutland: The Naval War in Northern European Waters, August 1914–February 1915. Annapolis, Maryland: Naval Institute Press. ISBN 978-1-59114-349-9.
- Halpern, Paul G. (1995). A Naval History of World War I. Annapolis, Maryland: Naval Institute Press. ISBN 1-55750-352-4.
- Jellicoe, John (1919). The Grand Fleet, 1914–1916: Its Creation, Development, and Work. New York: George H. Doran Company. OCLC 13614571.
- Massie, Robert K. (2003). Castles of Steel: Britain, Germany, and the Winning of the Great War at Sea. New York: Random House. ISBN 0-679-45671-6.
- Parkes, Oscar (1990) [1966]. British Battleships, Warrior 1860 to Vanguard 1950: A History of Design, Construction, and Armament (New & rev. ed.). Annapolis, Maryland: Naval Institute Press. ISBN 1-55750-075-4.
- Preston, Antony (1985). "Great Britain and Empire Forces". In Gray, Randal (ed.). Conway's All the World's Fighting Ships 1906–1921. Annapolis, Maryland: Naval Institute Press. pp. 1–104. ISBN 0-85177-245-5.
- Showell, Jak Mallmann (2006). The U-boat Century: German Submarine Warfare 1906–2006. London: Chatham. ISBN 1-86176-241-0.
- Silverstone, Paul H. (1984). Directory of the World's Capital Ships. New York: Hippocrene Books. ISBN 0-88254-979-0.
- Tarrant, V. E. (1999) [1995]. Jutland: The German Perspective: A New View of the Great Battle, 31 May 1916. London: Brockhampton Press. ISBN 1-86019-917-8.
