= James Fergusson (Royal Navy officer) =

Royal Navy Admiral; Commander-in-Chief, America and West Indies Station (1871–1942)

Admiral Sir James Fergusson KCB KCMG
- Born: 16 April 1871
- Died: 13 April 1942 (aged 70)
- Military career
- Allegiance: United Kingdom
- Branch: Royal Navy
- Rank: Admiral
- Commands: North America and West Indies Station
- Conflicts: Second Boer War; World War I
- Awards: Knight Commander of the Order of the Bath; Knight Commander of the Order of St Michael and St George

Admiral Sir James Andrew Fergusson, KCB, KCMG (16 April 1871 – 13 April 1942) was a Royal Navy officer who went on to be Commander-in-Chief, America and West Indies Station.

== Naval career ==
Born the son of Sir James Fergusson, 6th Baronet and Lady Edith Christian Ramsay, Fergusson joined the Royal Navy in 1887. He served as a lieutenant on board the cruiser HMS Barrosa when in January 1900 he was landed in Cape Colony to take part in the Second Boer War, during which he was wounded, mentioned in despatches and promoted to commander on 21 October 1900, for services during the war. In 1902 he was posted to the battleship HMS Royal Sovereign, which in August commissioned as coast guard ship at Portsmouth.

He served in World War I commanding the battleships HMS Benbow and HMS Thunderer and seeing action at the Battle of Jutland in 1916. He went on to be Commander of Patrols at Malta and then Commander of the 2nd Light Cruiser Squadron in which capacity he was present at the surrender of the German Fleet.

After the War he became Deputy Chief of the Naval Staff and then Assistant-Chief of the Naval Staff. He became Commander of the 1st Light Cruiser Squadron in 1920 and went on to be Commander-in-Chief, America and West Indies Station in 1924.

== Honours ==
Fergusson was appointed a Companion of the Order of the Bath (CB) in the 1918 New Year Honours, and promoted to Knight Commander of the Order (KCB) in the 1925 Birthday Honours. He was also appointed a Knight Commander of the Order of St Michael and St George (KCMG) in 1920 in recognition of wartime services.

== Family ==
In 1901 he married Enid Githa Williams (known by her middle name); they had four daughters. Githa Williams was a daughter of New Zealand landowner and prominent Wellington resident, Thomas Coldham Williams. Her elder sister Eila married Vernon Reed in 1909; he represented the Bay of Islands electorate in the New Zealand House of Representatives.

Fergusson's elder brother Sir Charles Fergusson, 7th Baronet, was 3rd Governor-General of New Zealand (1924–1930).

Military offices
| Preceded by Sir Sydney Fremantle | Deputy Chief of the Naval Staff; May 1919–August 1919 | Succeeded by Sir Osmond Brock |
| Preceded by Sir Michael Culme-Seymour | Commander-in-Chief, North America and West Indies Station; 1924–1926 | Succeeded by Sir Walter Cowan |
