= HMS Thunderer (1911) =

Orion-class dreadnought battleship of the Royal Navy

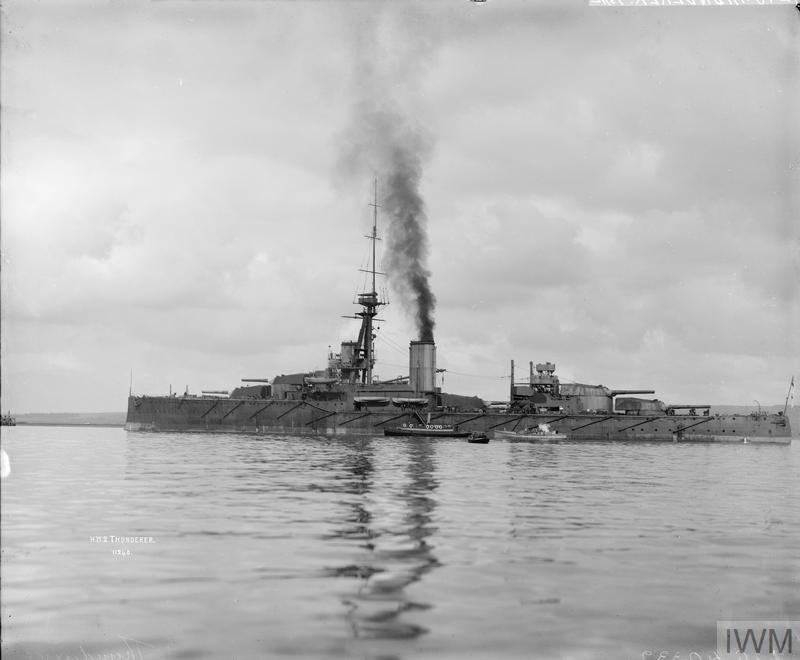
- Thunderer at anchor, shortly after completion in 1912

History

United Kingdom
- Name: Thunderer
- Ordered: 1909
- Builder: Thames Ironworks and Shipbuilding Company, Poplar, London
- Laid down: 13 April 1910
- Launched: 1 February 1911
- Commissioned: 15 June 1912
- Decommissioned: 1921
- Reclassified: As cadet training ship, 1922
- Fate: Sold for scrap, 6 November 1926

General characteristics (as built)
- Class & type: Orion-class dreadnought battleship
- Displacement: 21,922 long tons (22,274 t) (normal)
- Length: 581 ft (177.1 m) (o/a)
- Beam: 88 ft 6 in (27.0 m)
- Draught: 31 ft 3 in (9.5 m)
- Installed power: 27,000 shp (20,000 kW); 18 × Babcock & Wilcox boilers
- Propulsion: 4 × shafts; 2 × steam turbine sets
- Speed: 21 knots (39 km/h; 24 mph)
- Range: 6,730 nmi (12,460 km; 7,740 mi) at 10 knots (19 km/h; 12 mph)
- Complement: 738–1,107 (1917)
- Armament: 5 × twin 13.5-inch (343 mm) guns; 16 × single 4-inch (102 mm) guns; 3 × 21-inch (533 mm) torpedo tubes
- Armour: Belt: 8–12 in (203–305 mm); Deck: 1–4 inches (25–102 mm); Turrets: 11 in (279 mm); Barbettes: 10 inches (254 mm)

HMS Thunderer was the fourth and last Orion-class dreadnought battleship built for the Royal Navy in the early 1910s. She spent the bulk of her career assigned to the Home and Grand Fleets. Aside from participating in the Battle of Jutland in May 1916 and the inconclusive action of 19 August, her service during World War I generally consisted of routine patrols and training in the North Sea.

After the Grand Fleet was dissolved in early 1919, Thunderer was transferred back to the Home Fleet for a few months before she was assigned to the Reserve Fleet. The ship was converted into a training ship for naval cadets in 1921 and served in that role until she was sold for scrap in late 1926. While being towed to the scrapyard, Thunderer ran aground; the ship was refloated and subsequently broken up.

== Design and description ==
The Orion-class ships were designed in response to the beginnings of the Anglo-German naval arms race and were much larger than their predecessors of the Colossus-class battleship to accommodate larger, more powerful guns and heavier armour. In recognition of these improvements, the class was sometimes called "super-dreadnoughts". The ships had an overall length of 581 feet (177.1 m), a beam of 88 feet 6 inches (27.0 m) and a deep draught of 31 feet 3 inches (9.5 m). They displaced 21,922 long tons (22,274 t) at normal load and 25,596 long tons (26,007 t) at deep load as built; by 1918 Thunderer's deep displacement had increased to 27,416 long tons (27,856 t). Her crew numbered 738 officers and ratings when completed in 1912 and 1,107 in 1917.

The Orion class was powered by two sets of Parsons direct-drive steam turbines, each driving two shafts, using steam provided by 18 Babcock & Wilcox boilers. The turbines were rated at 27,000 shaft horsepower (20,000 kW) and were intended to give the battleships a speed of 21 knots (39 km/h; 24 mph). During her sea trials on 5 March 1912, Thunderer reached a maximum speed of 20.8 knots (38.5 km/h; 23.9 mph) from 27,427 shp (20,452 kW), although hampered by a boiler malfunction. The ships carried enough coal and fuel oil to give them a range of 6,730 nautical miles (12,460 km; 7,740 mi) at a cruising speed of 10 knots (19 km/h; 12 mph).

=== Armament and armour ===
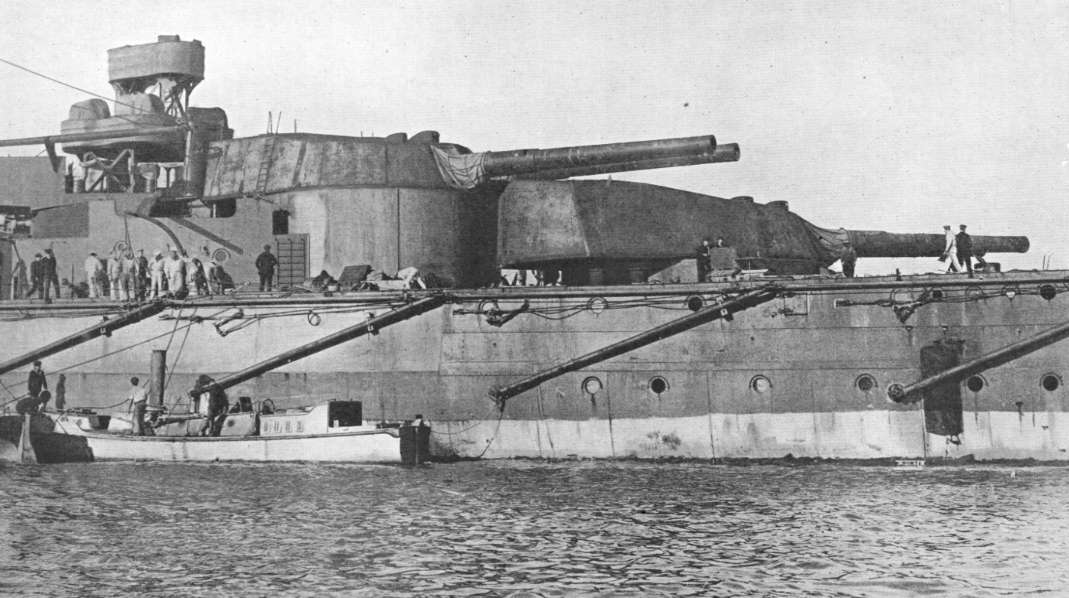
The ship's aft main-gun turrets, about 1914–1915

The Orion class was equipped with 10 breech-loading (BL) 13.5-inch (343 mm) Mark V guns in five hydraulically powered twin-gun turrets, all on the centreline. The turrets were designated 'A', 'B', 'Q', 'X' and 'Y', from front to rear. Their secondary armament consisted of 16 BL 4-inch (102 mm) Mark VII guns. These guns were split evenly between the forward and aft superstructure, all in single mounts. Four 3-pounder (1.9 in (47 mm)) saluting guns were also carried. The ships were equipped with three 21-inch (533 mm) submerged torpedo tubes, one on each broadside and another in the stern, for which 20 torpedoes were provided.

The Orions were protected by a waterline 12-inch (305 mm) armoured belt that extended between the end barbettes. Their decks ranged in thickness between 1 inch (25 mm) and 4 inches with the thickest portions protecting the steering gear in the stern. The main battery turret faces were 11 inches (279 mm) thick, and the turrets were supported by 10-inch-thick (254 mm) barbettes.

=== Modifications ===
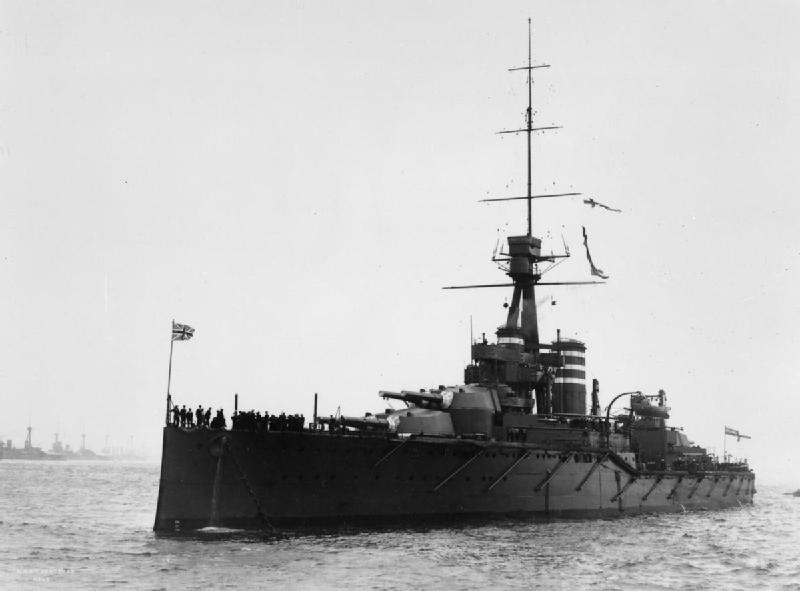
Thunderer at Spithead, late 1912; the gunnery director is barely visible.

A prototype fire-control director was installed sometime before November 1912, on a platform below the spotting top. In 1914 the shelter-deck guns were enclosed in casemates and by October 1914, a pair of 3-inch (76 mm) anti-aircraft (AA) guns were installed aboard each ship. Additional deck armour was added after the Battle of Jutland in May 1916. Around the same time, a pair of four-inch guns were removed from the aft superstructure. Two flying-off platforms were fitted aboard the ship during 1917–1918; these were mounted on 'B' and 'X' turret roofs and extended onto the gun barrels. A high-angle rangefinder was fitted in the forward superstructure by 1921.

== Construction and career ==
Thunderer was the sixth ship of her name to serve in the Royal Navy and was laid down by the Thames Ironworks and Shipbuilding Company at their shipyard in Poplar, London on 13 April 1910 and launched on 1 February 1911. She was commissioned on 15 June 1912 at Devonport. Including her armament, her cost is variously quoted at £1,892,823 or £1,885,145. Thunderer and her sister ships comprised the Second Division of the 2nd Battle Squadron (BS) of the Home Fleet. The ship, together with her sisters Monarch and Orion, participated in the Parliamentary Naval Review on 9 July at Spithead. They then participated in training manoeuvres with Vice-Admiral Prince Louis of Battenberg commanding the "Blue Fleet" aboard Thunderer. On 13 November, the ship participated in comparative gunnery trials with Orion to evaluate the effectiveness of the former's gunnery director. Thunderer decisively outshot the latter ship, although some of her success was because her director was above the smoke that obscured the target from Orion's guns. The test was repeated in better conditions on 4 December and Orion performed much better, apparently beating Thunderer. The three sisters were present with the 2nd BS to receive the President of France, Raymond Poincaré, at Spithead on 24 June 1913. During the annual manoeuvres in August, Thunderer was the flagship of Vice-Admiral Sir John Jellicoe, commander of the "Red Fleet". On 4 November, Thunderer, Orion, the dreadnought King George V and the predreadnought King Edward VII fired at and sank the target ship Empress of India to give their crews experience in firing live ammunition against a real ship.

=== World War I ===
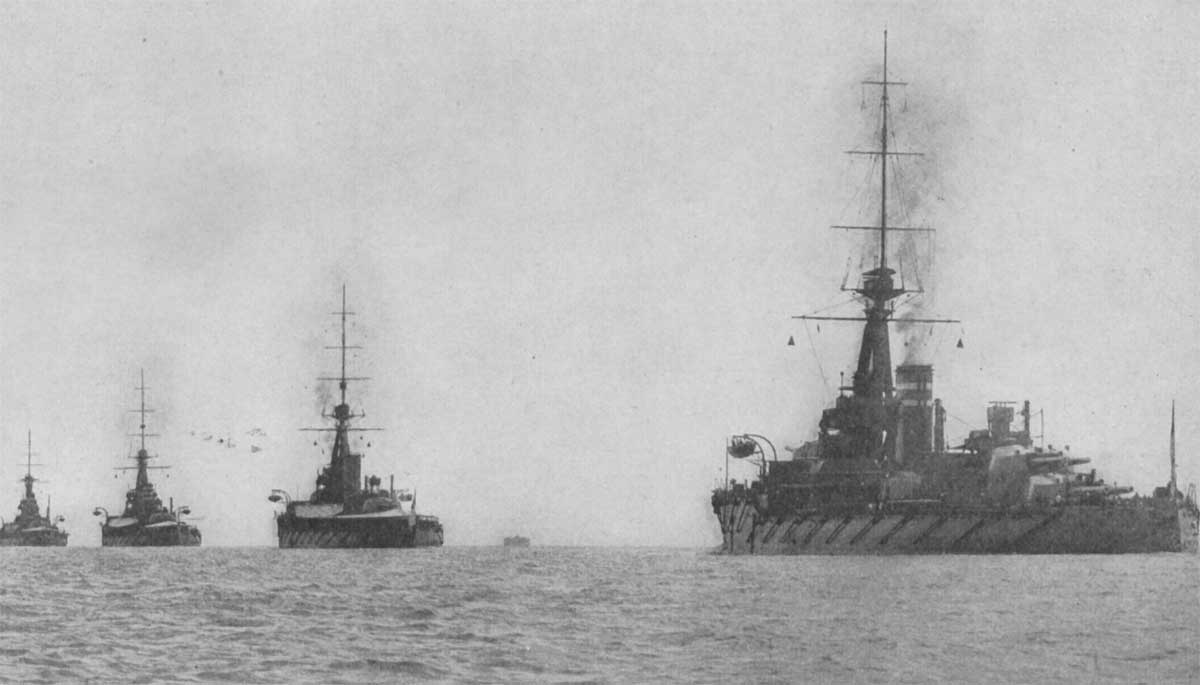
The 2nd BS sailing through the Solent, about 1914. From left to right, King George V, Thunderer, Monarch, and Conqueror.

Between 17 and 20 July 1914, Thunderer took part in a test mobilisation and fleet review as part of the British response to the July Crisis. Arriving in Portland on 25 July, she was ordered to proceed with the rest of the Home Fleet to Scapa Flow four days later to safeguard the fleet from a possible surprise attack by the Imperial German Navy. In August 1914, following the outbreak of World War I, the Home Fleet was reorganised as the Grand Fleet, and placed under the command of Admiral Jellicoe. Repeated reports of submarines in Scapa Flow led Jellicoe to conclude that the defences there were inadequate and he ordered that the Grand Fleet be dispersed to other bases until the defences be reinforced. On 16 October the 2nd BS was sent to Loch na Keal on the western coast of Scotland. The squadron departed for gunnery practice off the northern coast of Ireland on the morning of 27 October and the dreadnought Audacious struck a mine, laid a few days earlier by the German armed merchant cruiser SS Berlin. Thinking that the ship had been torpedoed by a submarine, the other dreadnoughts were ordered away from the area, while smaller ships rendered assistance. On the evening of 22 November 1914, the Grand Fleet conducted a fruitless sweep in the southern half of the North Sea; Thunderer stood with the main body in support of Vice-Admiral David Beatty's 1st Battlecruiser Squadron. The fleet was back in port in Scapa Flow by 27 November. On 8 December, she sailed to Devonport for a brief refit to fix problems with her condensers.

==== 1915–1916 ====
Jellicoe's ships, including Thunderer, conducted gunnery drills on 10–13 January 1915 west of Orkney and Shetland. On the evening of 23 January, the bulk of the Grand Fleet sailed in support of Beatty's battlecruisers, but Thunderer and the rest of the fleet did not participate in the ensuing Battle of Dogger Bank the following day. On 7–10 March, the Grand Fleet conducted a sweep in the northern North Sea, during which it conducted training manoeuvres. Another such cruise took place on 16–19 March. On 11 April, the Grand Fleet conducted a patrol in the central North Sea and returned to port on 14 April; another patrol in the area took place on 17–19 April, followed by gunnery drills off Shetland on 20–21 April.

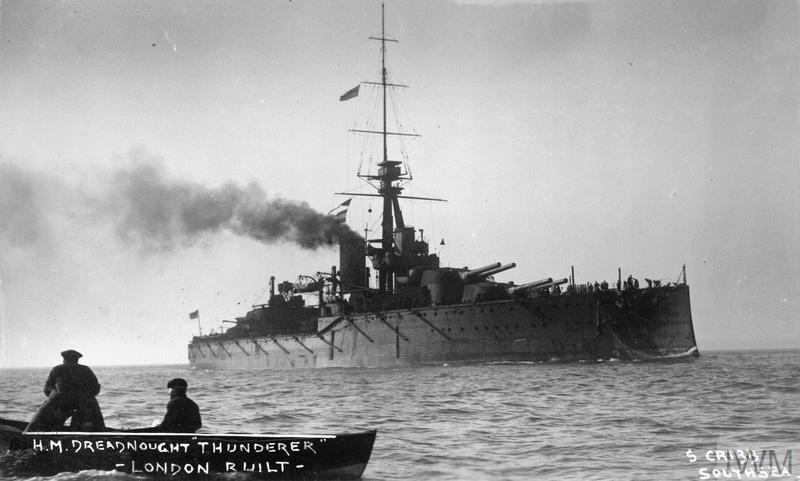
Thunderer under way shortly after completion, 1912

The Grand Fleet conducted sweeps into the central North Sea on 17–19 May and 29–31 May without encountering any German vessels. During 11–14 June, the fleet conducted gunnery practice and battle exercises west of Shetland and more training off Shetland beginning on 11 July. The 2nd BS conducted gunnery practice in the Moray Firth on 2 August and then returned to Scapa Flow. On 2–5 September, the fleet went on another cruise in the northern end of the North Sea and conducted gunnery drills. Throughout the rest of the month, the Grand Fleet conducted numerous training exercises. The ship, together with the majority of the Grand Fleet, conducted another sweep into the North Sea from 13 to 15 October. Almost three weeks later, Thunderer participated in another fleet training operation west of Orkney during 2–5 November and repeated the exercise at the beginning of December.

The Grand Fleet sortied in response to an attack by German ships on British light forces near Dogger Bank on 10 February 1916, but it was recalled two days later when it became clear that no German ships larger than a destroyer were involved. The fleet departed for a cruise in the North Sea on 26 February; Jellicoe had intended to use the Harwich Force to sweep the Heligoland Bight, but bad weather prevented operations in the southern North Sea. As a result, the operation was confined to the northern end of the sea. Another sweep began on 6 March, but had to be abandoned the following day as the weather grew too severe for the escorting destroyers. On the night of 25 March, Thunderer and the rest of the fleet sailed from Scapa Flow to support Beatty's battlecruisers and other light forces raiding the German Zeppelin base at Tondern. By the time the Grand Fleet approached the area on 26 March, the British and German forces had already disengaged and a strong gale threatened the light craft, so the fleet was ordered to return to base. On 21 April, the Grand Fleet conducted a demonstration off Horns Reef to distract the Germans while the Imperial Russian Navy relaid its defensive minefields in the Baltic Sea. The fleet returned to Scapa Flow on 24 April and refuelled before proceeding south in response to intelligence reports that the Germans were about to launch a raid on Lowestoft, but only arrived in the area after the Germans had withdrawn. On 2–4 May, the fleet conducted another demonstration off Horns Reef to keep German attention focused on the North Sea.

==== Battle of Jutland ====
Maps showing the manoeuvres of the British (blue) and German (red) fleets on 31 May – 1 June 1916

In an attempt to lure out and destroy a portion of the Grand Fleet, the High Seas Fleet, composed of sixteen dreadnoughts, six predreadnoughts and supporting ships, departed the Jade Bight early on the morning of 31 May. The fleet sailed in concert with Hipper's five battlecruisers. Room 40 had intercepted and decrypted German radio traffic containing plans of the operation. In response the Admiralty ordered the Grand Fleet, totalling some 28 dreadnoughts and 9 battlecruisers, to sortie the night before to cut off and destroy the High Seas Fleet.

On 31 May, Thunderer, under the command of Captain James Fergusson, was the eighth ship from the head of the battle line after deployment. At 18:27 (Note: The times used in this section are in UT, which is one hour behind CET, which is often used in German works.) the ship briefly fired at the crippled light cruiser SMS Wiesbaden, although the number of hits made, if any, is unknown, until her view was blocked by other British ships. Less than an hour later, Thunderer sighted two German dreadnoughts visible between Royal Oak and Iron Duke at about 19:15. She fired three salvoes of common pointed, capped (CPC) at the leading ship, but no hits were made and the second salvo was actually fired over the top of Iron Duke, before her view was totally obscured. After sunset, the battlecruiser SMS Moltke spotted the four Orion-class ships at 22:30 and signalled a challenge to Thunderer before sheering off. Fergusson chose not to engage without an obvious threat lest he reveal the location of the battlefleet. Thunderer fired just thirty-seven 13.5-inch shells (all CPC) during the battle.

==== Subsequent activity ====
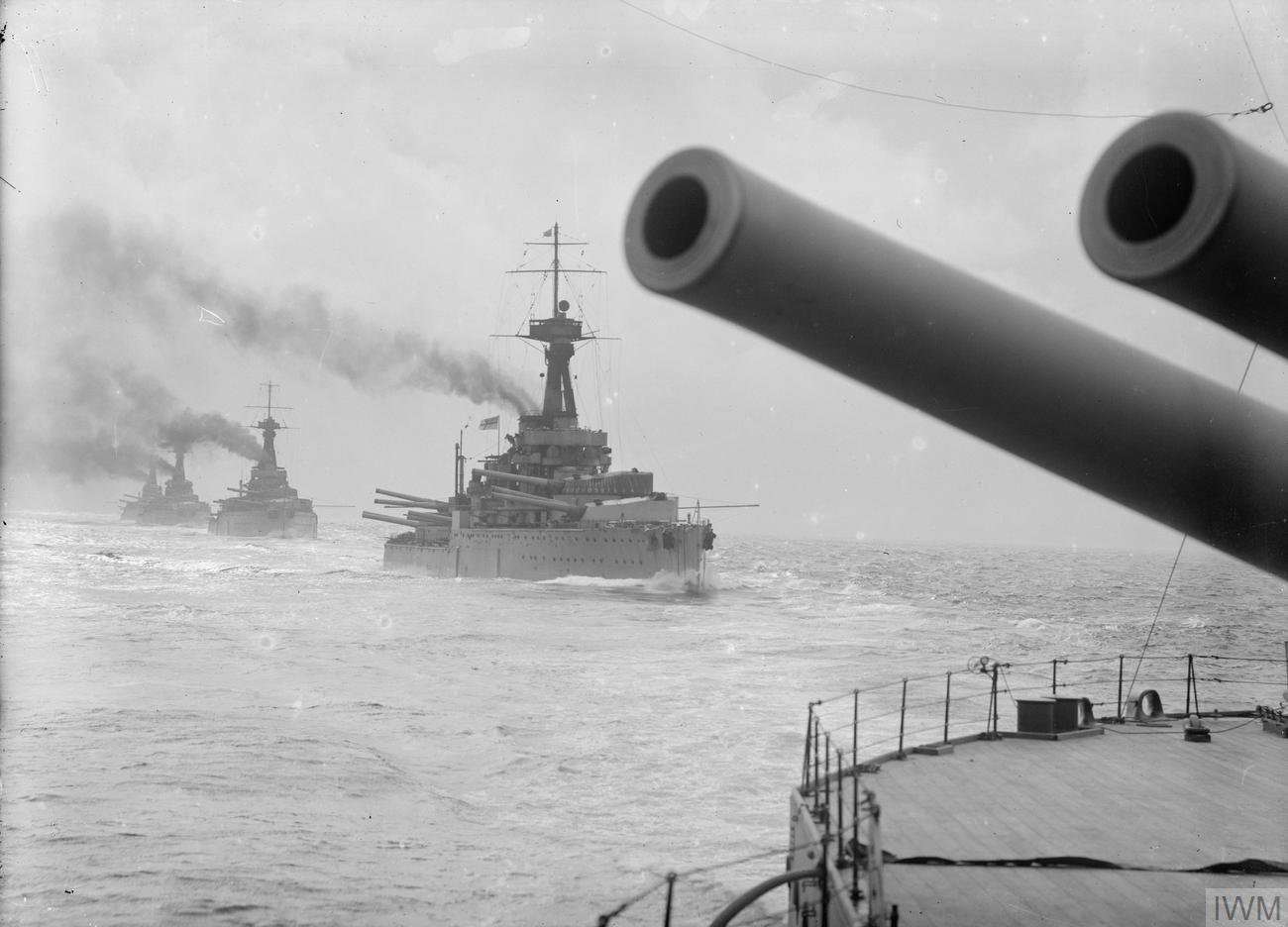
The four Orion-class battleships in line ahead formation, after 1915

The Grand Fleet sortied on 18 August to ambush the High Seas Fleet while it advanced into the southern North Sea, but a series of miscommunications and mistakes prevented Jellicoe from intercepting the German fleet before it returned to port. Two light cruisers were sunk by German U-boats during the operation, prompting Jellicoe to decide to not risk the major units of the fleet south of 55° 30' North due to the prevalence of German submarines and mines. The Admiralty concurred and stipulated that the Grand Fleet would not sortie unless the German fleet was attempting an invasion of Britain or there was a strong possibility it could be forced into an engagement under suitable conditions.

In April 1918, the High Seas Fleet again sortied, to attack British convoys to Norway. They enforced strict wireless silence during the operation, which prevented Room 40 cryptanalysts from warning the new commander of the Grand Fleet, Admiral Beatty. The British only learned of the operation after an accident aboard the battlecruiser SMS Moltke forced her to break radio silence to inform the German commander of her condition. Beatty then ordered the Grand Fleet to sea to intercept the Germans, but he was not able to reach the High Seas Fleet before it turned back for Germany. The ship was present at Rosyth, Scotland, when the High Seas Fleet surrendered there on 21 November and she remained part of the 2nd BS through 1 March 1919.

By 1 May, Thunderer had been assigned to the 3rd BS of the Home Fleet. On 1 November, the 3rd BS was disbanded and Thunderer was transferred to the Reserve Fleet at Portland, together with her sisters. She was temporarily recommissioned during the summers of 1920 to ferry troops to the Mediterranean and back. The ship was still in Portland as of 18 December 1920, but was converted into a naval cadet training ship at Rosyth beginning in February 1921. Thunderer recommissioned on 5 May, but did not begin her first training cruise until 24 June. The ship was relieved by the monitor Erebus on 31 August 1926 and paid off at Portsmouth.

On 6 November, Thunderer was sold for scrap to Messrs, Hughes, Bolckow & Co. for £66,150. She was too deep in draught to enter their scrapyard in Blyth and so was partially stripped down at Rosyth. Even so, she grounded at the Blyth harbour entrance on 24 December. After she was refloated on 30 December, she went back to Rosyth to be further lightened, as her draught was still too deep to allow her to enter Blyth. She was towed from Rosyth on 12 April 1927 and reached Blyth two days later to finish demolition.

== Bibliography ==
- Brooks, John (1996). "Percy Scott and the Director". In McLean, David; Preston, Antony (eds.). Warship 1996. London: Conway Maritime Press. pp. 150–70. ISBN 0-85177-685-X.
- Brown, David K. (1999). The Grand Fleet: Warship Design and Development 1906–1922. Annapolis, Maryland: Naval Institute Press. ISBN 1-55750-315-X.
- Burt, R. A. (1986). British Battleships of World War One. Annapolis, Maryland: Naval Institute Press. ISBN 0-87021-863-8.
- Campbell, N. J. M. (1986). Jutland: An Analysis of the Fighting. Annapolis, Maryland: Naval Institute Press. ISBN 0-87021-324-5.
- Corbett, Julian (1997) [1940]. Naval Operations. History of the Great War: Based on Official Documents. Vol. III (Second ed.). London and Nashville, Tennessee: Imperial War Museum in association with the Battery Press. ISBN 1-870423-50-X.
- Dodson, Aidan (2026). "The Cadet Training Ships of the Royal Navy". In Jordan, John (ed.). Warship 2026. Osprey Publishing. pp. 156–174. ISBN 978-1-4728-7259-3.
- Friedman, Norman (2015). The British Battleship 1906–1946. Barnsley, UK: Seaforth Publishing. ISBN 978-1-84832-225-7.
- Friedman, Norman (2011). Naval Weapons of World War One: Guns, Torpedoes, Mines and ASW Weapons of All Nations; An Illustrated Directory. Barnsley, UK: Seaforth Publishing. ISBN 978-1-84832-100-7.
- Halpern, Paul G. (1995). A Naval History of World War I. Annapolis, Maryland: Naval Institute Press. ISBN 1-55750-352-4.
- Jellicoe, John (1919). The Grand Fleet, 1914–1916: Its Creation, Development, and Work. New York: George H. Doran Company. OCLC 13614571.
- Massie, Robert K. (2003). Castles of Steel: Britain, Germany, and the Winning of the Great War at Sea. New York: Random House. ISBN 0-679-45671-6.
- Newbolt, Henry (1996) [1931]. Naval Operations. History of the Great War Based on Official Documents. Vol. V. Nashville, Tennessee: Battery Press. ISBN 0-89839-255-1.
- Parkes, Oscar (1990) [1966]. British Battleships, Warrior 1860 to Vanguard 1950: A History of Design, Construction, and Armament (New & rev. ed.). Annapolis, Maryland: Naval Institute Press. ISBN 1-55750-075-4.
- Preston, Antony (1985). "Great Britain and Empire Forces". In Gray, Randal (ed.). Conway's All the World's Fighting Ships 1906–1921. Annapolis, Maryland: Naval Institute Press. pp. 1–104. ISBN 0-85177-245-5.
- Tarrant, V. E. (1999) [1995]. Jutland: The German Perspective: A New View of the Great Battle, 31 May 1916. London: Brockhampton Press. ISBN 1-86019-917-8.
