= King George V-class battleship (1911) =

1911 class of battleships of the Royal Navy

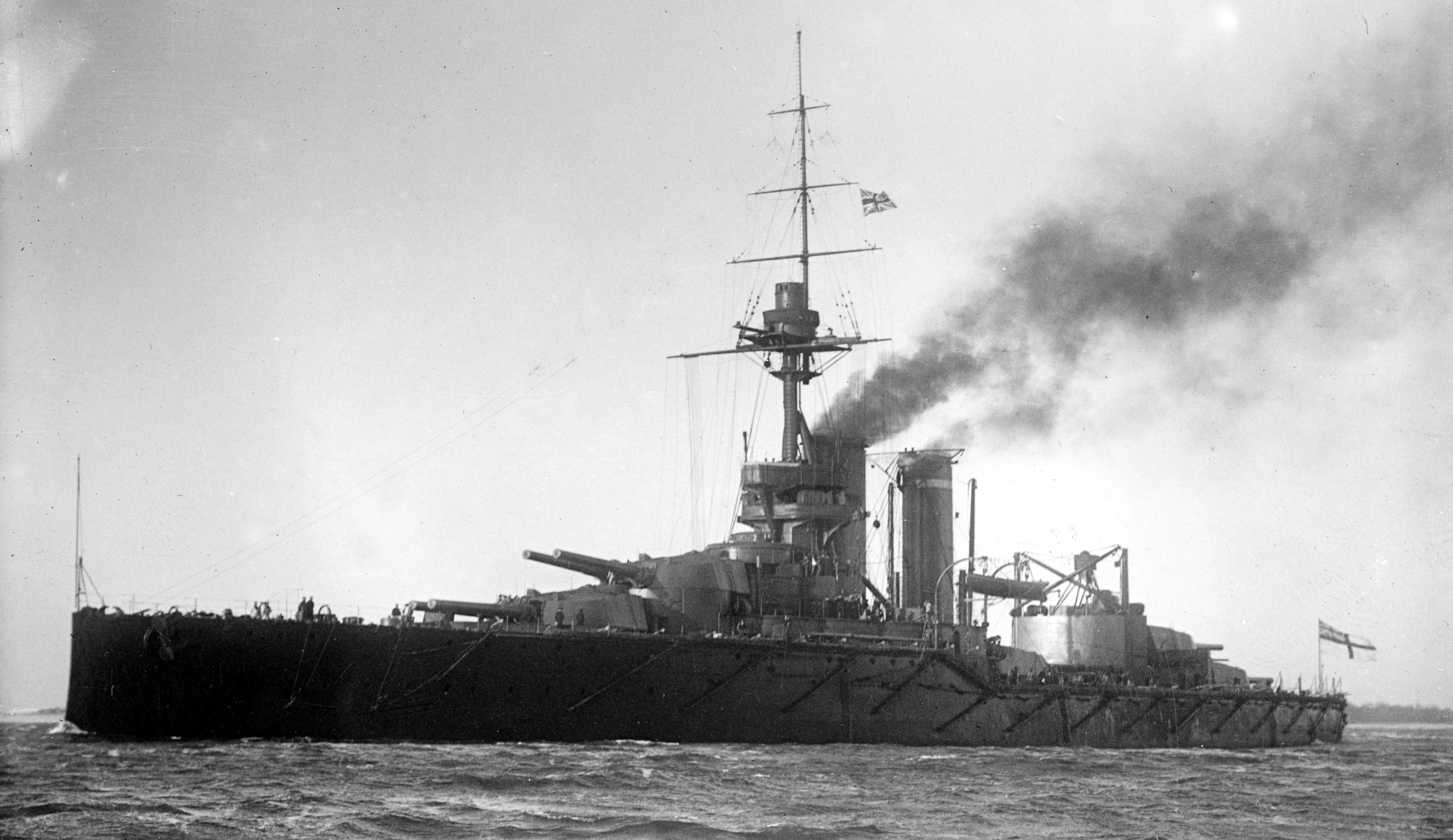
- Audacious underway, about 1914

Class overview
- Name: King George V class
- Builders: Cammell Laird; Devonport Dockyard; Portsmouth Dockyard; Scotts Shipbuilding & Eng.
- Operators: Royal Navy
- Preceded by: Orion class
- Succeeded by: Iron Duke class
- In commission: 1912–1944
- Completed: 4
- Lost: 1
- Scrapped: 3

General characteristics (as built)
- Type: Dreadnought battleship
- Displacement: 25,420 long tons (25,830 t) (normal)
- Length: 597 ft 9 in (182.2 m) (o/a)
- Beam: 89 ft 1 in (27.2 m)
- Draught: 28 ft 8 in (8.7 m)
- Installed power: 18 × water-tube boilers; 27,000 shp (20,000 kW)
- Propulsion: 4 × shafts; 2 × steam turbine sets
- Speed: 21 knots (39 km/h; 24 mph)
- Range: 6,310 nmi (11,690 km; 7,260 mi) at 10 knots (19 km/h; 12 mph)
- Complement: 860–1,114 (1916)
- Armament: 5 × twin 13.5 in (343 mm) guns; 16 × single 4 in (102 mm) guns; 3 × 21 in (533 mm) torpedo tubes
- Armour: Belt: 12 in (305 mm); Deck: 1–4 in (25–102 mm); Turrets: 11 in (280 mm); Barbettes: 10 in (254 mm)

The King George V-class battleships were a group of four dreadnought battleships built for the Royal Navy (RN) in the early 1910s that were sometimes termed super-dreadnoughts. The sister ships spent most of their careers assigned to the 2nd Battle Squadron of the Home and Grand Fleets, sometimes serving as flagships. In October 1914, Audacious struck a mine and sank. Aside from participating in the failed attempt to intercept the German ships that had bombarded Scarborough, Hartlepool and Whitby in late 1914, the Battle of Jutland in May 1916 and the inconclusive action of 19 August, the surviving ships' service during the First World War generally consisted of routine patrols and training in the North Sea.

The three surviving ships were briefly reduced to reserve in 1919 before being transferred to the Mediterranean Fleet in 1920–1921 where they played minor roles in the Allied intervention in the Russian Civil War and the Chanak Crisis of 1922. The first ship to return to Britain, King George V, became a training ship in 1923 but the other two were placed into reserve again upon their return the following year. The imminent completion of the two Nelson-class battleships in 1927 forced the sale of King George V and Ajax for scrap at the end of 1926 while Centurion was converted into a target ship to comply with the tonnage limitations of the Washington Naval Treaty.

During the Second World War, Centurion was rearmed with light weapons and was converted into a blockship and was then modified into a decoy with dummy gun turrets. Centurion was sent to the Mediterranean in 1942 to escort a convoy to Malta, although the Italians quickly figured out the deception. The ship was deliberately sunk during the Invasion of Normandy in 1944 to form a breakwater.

== Design and description ==
Ordered as part of the 1910–1911 Naval Programme, the King George V class was an enlarged version of the preceding Orion class with additional armour, a revised layout of the secondary armament and improved fire-control arrangements. The ships had an overall length of 597 feet 9 inches (182.2 m), a beam of 90 feet 1 inch (27.5 m) and a draught of 28 feet 8 inches (8.7 m). They displaced 25,420 long tons (25,830 t) at normal load and 27,120 long tons (27,560 t) at deep load. Their crew numbered around 869 officers and ratings upon completion and 1,114 in 1916.

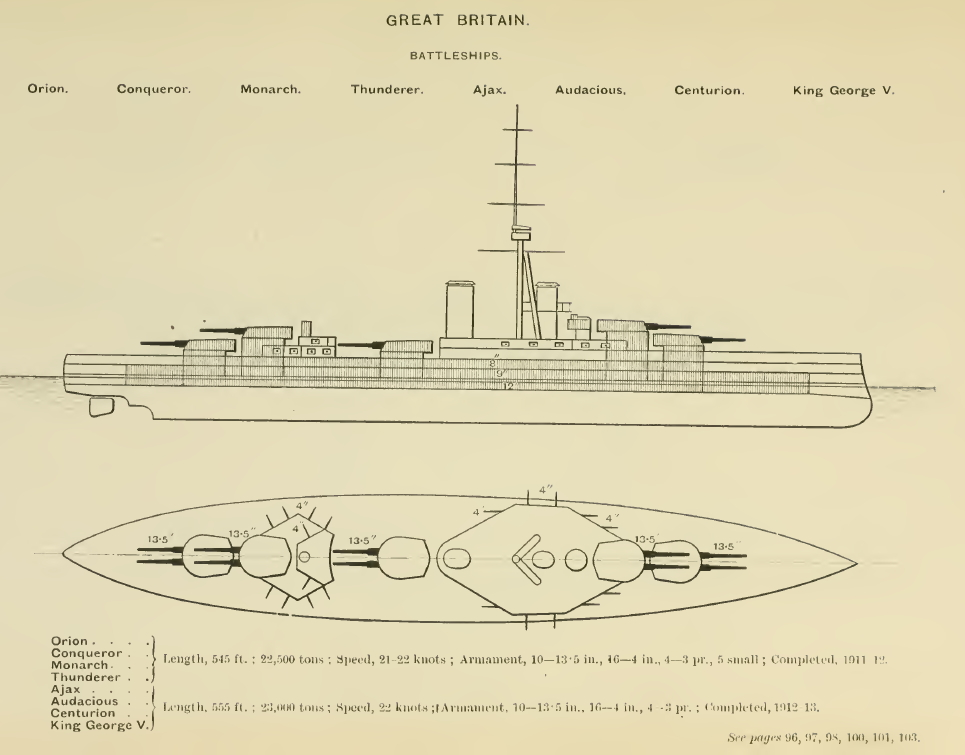
Right elevations and plans for the Orion- and King George V-class battleships from Brassey's Naval Annual 1915, before the mast was moved forward of the funnel in the latter ships.

Sea trials with the battlecruiser Lion showed that the placement of the fore funnel between the forward superstructure and the foremast meant that hot clinkers and flue gases from the boilers made the spotting top on the foremast completely unworkable when the forward boilers were alight and that the upper bridge could easily be rendered uninhabitable, depending on the wind. The King George V class also used the same arrangement and they were altered while under construction to remedy the problem at a cost of approximately £20,000 per ship. The fore funnel was moved aft and a makeshift foremast was built from one of the struts of the original tripod mast. The spotting tower at the rear of the conning tower was removed, the conning tower enlarged, and the coincidence rangefinder was moved from the foremast spotting top to the roof of the conning tower.

The ships of the King George V class were powered by two sets of Parsons direct-drive steam turbines. The outer propeller shafts were coupled to the high-pressure turbines in the outer engine rooms and these exhausted into low-pressure turbines in the centre engine room which drove the inner shafts. The turbines used steam provided by 18 water-tube boilers. They were rated at 27,000 shaft horsepower (20,000 kW) and were intended to give the battleships a maximum speed of 21 knots (39 km/h; 24 mph). During their sea trials, the ships exceeded their designed speed and horsepower, reaching a maximum of 22.9 knots (42.4 km/h; 26.4 mph). They carried a maximum of 3,100 long tons (3,150 t) of coal and an additional 840 long tons (853 t) of fuel oil that was sprayed on the coal to increase its burn rate. This gave them a range of 5,910–6,310 nautical miles (10,950–11,690 km; 6,800–7,260 mi) at a cruising speed of 10 knots (19 km/h; 12 mph).

=== Armament ===
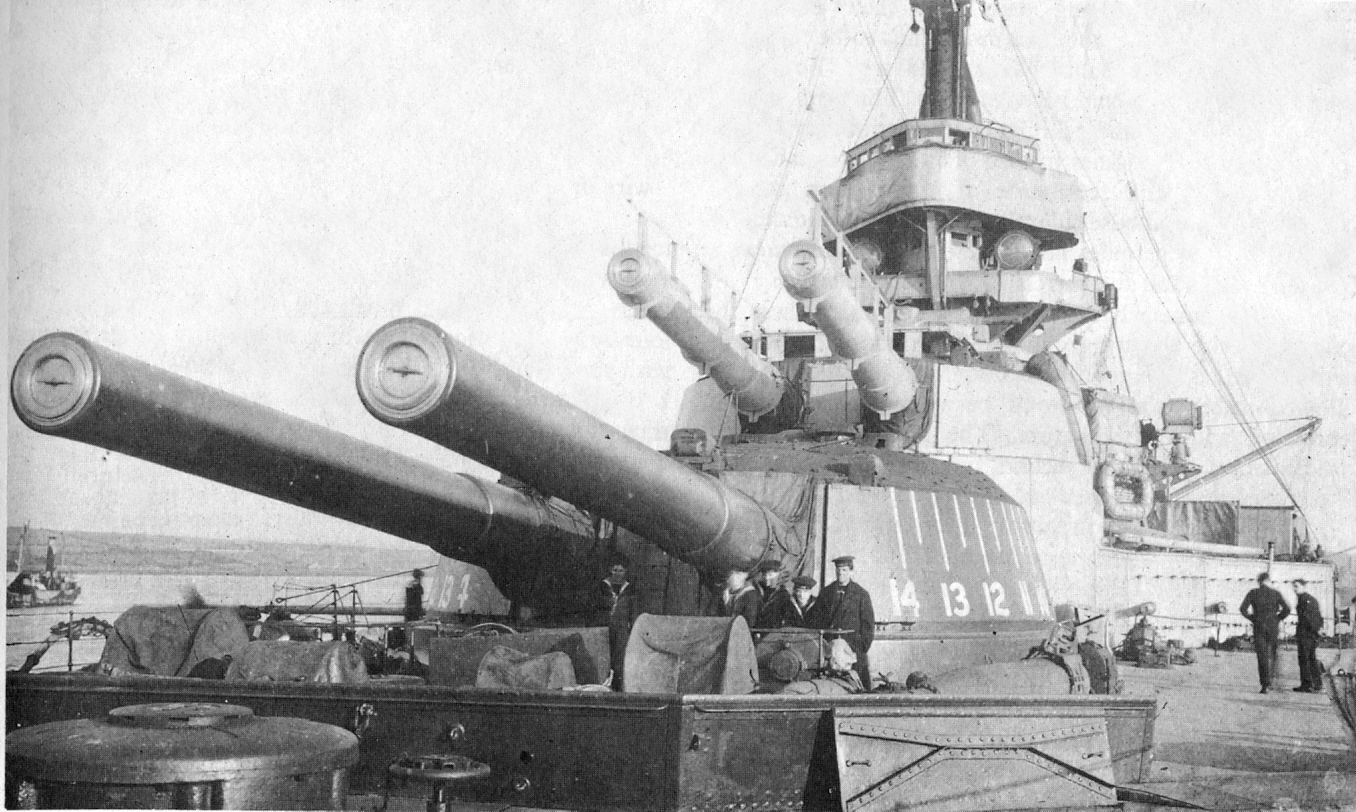
Ajax's forward main-gun turrets in 1918

The King George V class was equipped with ten 45-calibre breech-loading (BL) 13.5-inch Mark V gun in five hydraulically powered, centreline, twin-gun turrets, designated 'A', 'B', 'Q', 'X' and 'Y' from front to rear. The guns had a maximum elevation of +20° which gave them a range of 23,830 yards (21,790 m). Their gunsights, however, were limited to +15° until super-elevating prisms were installed by 1916 to allow full elevation. In contrast to the Orions, the loading machinery of these turrets was modified to accommodate longer and heavier 1,400-pound (635 kg) projectiles, some 150 pounds (68 kg) more than those of the Orions, at a muzzle velocity of about 2,500 feet per second (760 m/s) at a rate of two rounds per minute. The ships carried 100 shells per gun.

Training exercises had shown that destroyer and torpedo boats attacked more frequently from the frontal arc, so the sixteen 50-calibre BL four-inch (100 mm) Mark VII guns of the secondary armament was re-arranged to improve fire distribution ahead. Eight of these were mounted in the forward superstructure, four in the aft superstructure, and four in casemates in the side of the hull abreast of the forward main gun turrets, all in single mounts. The guns in the hull casemates were frequently unusable in heavy seas and were later removed during the war. The Mark VII guns had a maximum elevation of +15° which gave them a range of 11,400 yards (10,424 m). They fired 31-pound (14.1 kg) projectiles at a muzzle velocity of 2,821 ft/s (860 m/s). They were provided with 150 rounds per gun. Four 3-pounder (1.9 in [47 mm]) saluting guns were also carried. The ships were equipped with three 21-inch submerged torpedo tubes, one on each broadside and another in the stern, for which 14 torpedoes were provided.

=== Fire-control ===
The ships of the King George V class were some of the first battleships in the RN to receive the full suite of fire-control equipment used during the First World War. The control position for the main armament was located in the conning tower. Data from a 9-foot (2.7 m) coincidence rangefinder (an unstabilized Barr and Stroud instrument in King George V and stabilized Argo units in the other ships) on the roof of the conning tower, together with the target's speed and course information, was input into a Dumaresq mechanical computer and electrically transmitted to a Dreyer Fire-control Table (a Mark III system in King George V and Mark II Tables in the others with an Argo range clock replacing the Dreyer-Elphinstone model in the Mark III) located in the transmitting station located on the main deck. Wind speed and direction was called down to the transmitting station by either voicepipe or sound-powered telephone. The fire-control table integrated all the data and converted it into elevation and deflection data for use by the guns. The target's data was also graphically recorded on a plotting table to assist the gunnery officer in predicting the movement of the target. As a backup, two turrets in each ship could take over if necessary.

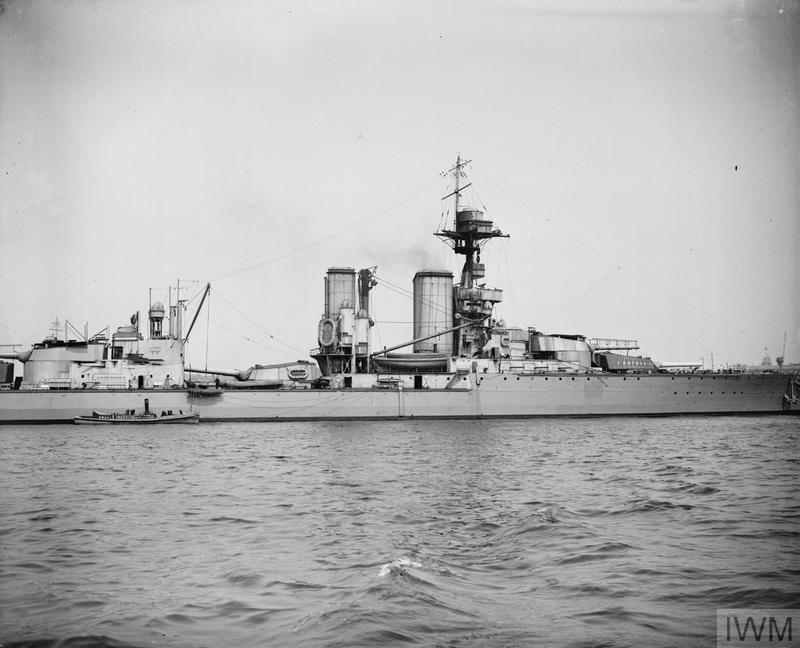
Centurion at anchor, June 1919. The director is visible on the roof of the spotting top as are the flying-off platforms on 'B' and 'X' turrets.

Fire-control technology advanced quickly during the years immediately preceding World War I, and the development of the director firing system was a major advance. This consisted of a fire-control director mounted high in the ship which electrically provided elevation and training angles to the turrets via pointer on a dial, which the turret crewmen only had to follow. The guns were fired simultaneously, which aided in spotting the shell splashes and minimised the effects of the roll on the dispersion of the shells. The weight of the director and the enlarged spotting top proved to be more than the unsupported foremast could bear, and it had to be reinforced when the directors were installed in 1913–1914 on the roof of the spotting top. The mast of King George V used flanges, but the other three ships received half-height tripod legs. The former ship's mast was rebuilt into a full-height tripod in 1918. Available sources do not acknowledge that Audacious was fitted with a director before her loss, but photographic evidence clearly shows one visible as she was sinking.

=== Armour ===
The King George Vs had a waterline belt of Krupp cemented armour that was 12 inches (305 mm) thick between the fore and rear barbettes. It reduced to 2.5–6 inches (64–152 mm) outside the central armoured citadel, but did not reach the bow or stern. The belt covered the side of the hull from 16 feet 10.5 inches (5.1 m) above the waterline to 3 feet 4 inches (1.0 m) below it. Above this was a strake of 9-inch (229 mm) armour. The fore and aft oblique 10-inch (254 mm) bulkheads connected the waterline and upper armour belts to the 'A' and 'Y' barbettes. The exposed faces of the barbettes were protected by armour 9 to 10 inches thick above the main deck that thinned to 3–7 inches (76–178 mm) below it. The gun turrets had 11-inch (279 mm) faces sides with 3- to 4-inch roofs. The guns in the forward superstructure were protected by armour 3–3.5 inches (76–89 mm) thick.

The four armoured decks ranged in thickness from 1 to 4 inches (25 to 102 mm) with the greater thicknesses outside the central armoured citadel. The front and sides of the conning tower were protected by 11-inch plates, although the roof was 3 inches thick. The gunnery control tower behind and above the conning tower had 4-inch sides and the torpedo-control tower aft had 6-inch sides and a 3-inch roof. Unlike the Orions, the anti-torpedo bulkheads were extended to cover the engine rooms, as well as the magazines with thicknesses ranging from 1 to 1.75 inches (25 to 44 mm). The boiler uptakes were protected by 1–1.5-inch (25–38 mm) armour plates.

=== Modifications ===
By October 1914, a pair of QF 3-inch (76 mm) anti-aircraft (AA) guns were installed aboard each ship. About 80 long tons (81 t) of additional deck armour was added after the Battle of Jutland in May 1916 and King George V was fitted to tow kite balloons around the same time. By April 1917, the ships had exchanged a 4-inch AA gun for one of the 3-inch guns and the four 4-inch guns in the hull casemates had been removed. The stern torpedo tube was removed during 1917–1918 and one or two flying-off platforms were fitted aboard each ship in 1918; these were mounted on turret roofs and extended onto the gun barrels. King George V had them on 'B' and 'Q' turrets, Centurion on 'B' and 'X' turrets and Ajax had one on 'B'.

== Ships in class ==
Construction data
Name	Builder	Laid down	Launched	Completed	Cost (including armament)
King George V (ex-Royal George)	HM Dockyard, Portsmouth	16 January 1911	9 October 1911	16 November 1912	£1,961,096
Centurion	HM Dockyard, Devonport	16 January 1911	18 November 1911	May 1913	£1,950,651
Ajax	Scotts Shipbuilding and Engineering Company, Greenock	27 February 1911	21 March 1912	March 1913	£1,918,813
Audacious	Cammell Laird, Birkenhead	23 March 1911	14 September 1912	August 1913	£1,889,387

== Careers ==
British and German ships saluting Kaiser Wilhelm II, Kiel, 24 June 1914; the four King George V-class ships are in the center background.

While conducting her sea trials on the night of 9/10 December, Centurion accidentally rammed and sank the Italian steamer SS Derna and she was under repair until March 1913. All four ships of the King George V class were assigned to the 2nd Battle Squadron upon commissioning, commanded by Vice-Admiral Sir George Warrender, and King George V was the squadron flagship by 18 February 1913. Centurion was present to receive the President of France, Raymond Poincaré, at Spithead on 24 June 1913. The sisters represented the Royal Navy during the celebrations of the re-opening of the Kaiser Wilhelm Canal in Kiel, Germany, 23–30 June 1914, held in conjunction with Kiel Week.

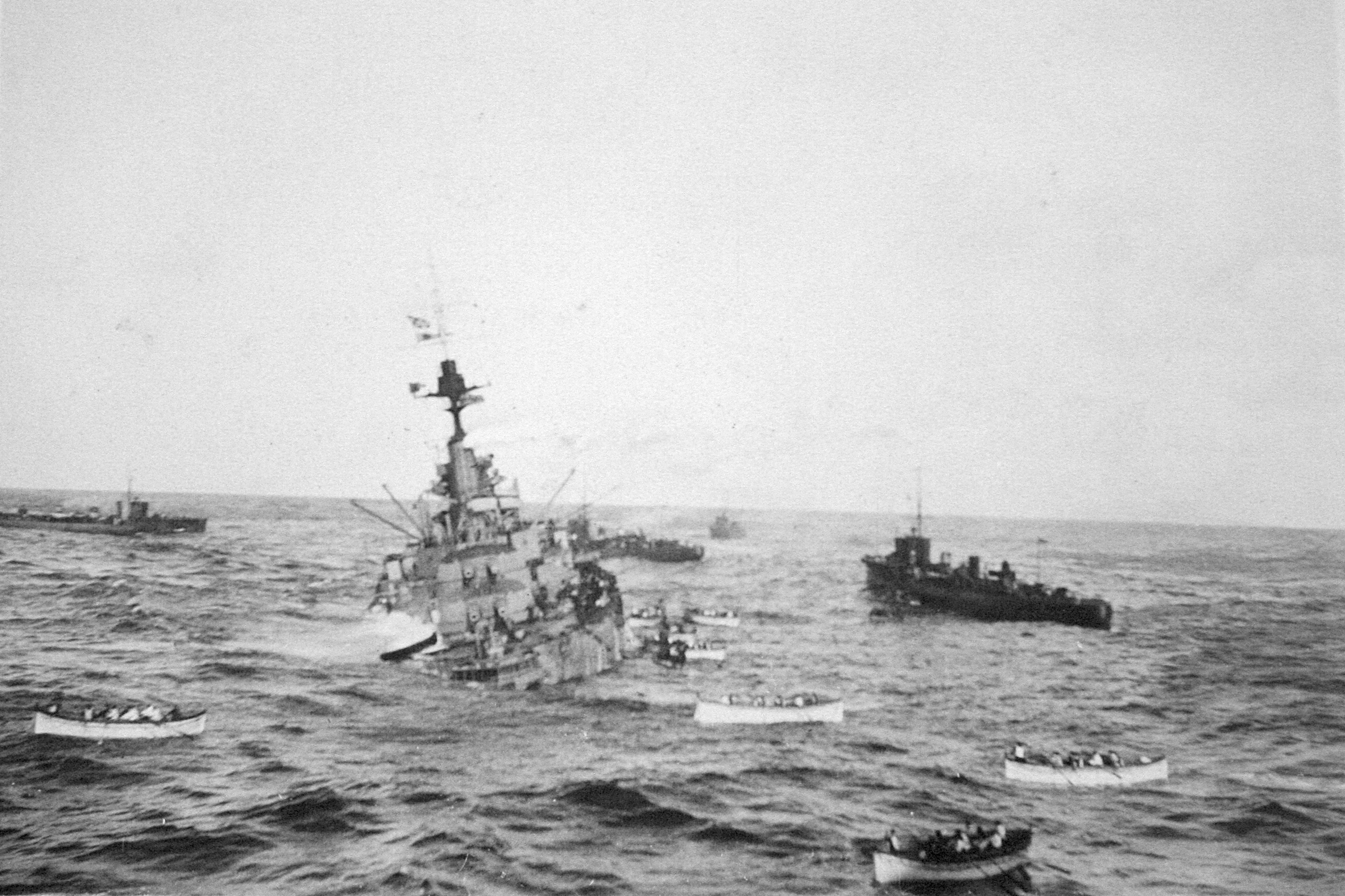
The crew of Audacious take to lifeboats to be taken aboard the ocean liner RMS Olympic, 27 October 1914.

Between 17 and 20 July 1914, the King George Vs took part in a test mobilisation and fleet review as part of the British response to the July Crisis. Afterwards, they were ordered to proceed with the rest of the Home Fleet to Scapa Flow to safeguard the fleet from a possible surprise attack by the Imperial German Navy. After the British declaration of war on Germany on 4 August, the Home Fleet was reorganised as the Grand Fleet, and placed under the command of Admiral Jellicoe. According to pre-war doctrine, the role of the Grand Fleet was to fight a decisive battle against the German High Seas Fleet. This grand battle was slow to happen, however, because of the Germans' reluctance to commit their battleships against the superior British force. As a result, the Grand Fleet spent its time training in the North Sea, punctuated by the occasional mission to intercept a German raid or major fleet sortie. While the 2nd Battle Squadron was conducting gunnery training off the northern coast of Ireland on 27 October, Audacious struck a mine and sank; all of her crew was successfully rescued before she capsized. King George V developed problems with her condensers in November. This forced the ship to be intermittently withdrawn from operations over the next several months while the condensers had their tubes replaced.

=== Bombardment of Scarborough, Hartlepool and Whitby ===
The Royal Navy's Room 40 had intercepted and decrypted German radio traffic containing plans for a German attack on Scarborough, Hartlepool and Whitby in mid-December using the four battlecruisers of Konteradmiral (Rear-Admiral) Franz von Hipper's I Scouting Group. The radio messages did not mention that the High Seas Fleet with fourteen dreadnoughts and eight predreadnoughts would reinforce Hipper. The ships of both sides departed their bases on 15 December, with the British intending to ambush the German ships on their return voyage. They mustered the six dreadnoughts of the 2nd Battle Squadron, including the three surviving King George Vs, and the four battlecruisers of Vice-Admiral Sir David Beatty.

The screening forces of each side blundered into each other during the early morning darkness and heavy weather of 16 December. The Germans got the better of the initial exchange of fire, severely damaging several British destroyers, but Admiral Friedrich von Ingenohl, commander of the High Seas Fleet, ordered his ships to turn away, concerned about the possibility of a massed attack by British destroyers in the dawn's light. A series of miscommunications and mistakes by the British allowed Hipper's ships to avoid an engagement with Beatty's forces.

=== Battle of Jutland ===
Maps showing the manoeuvres of the British (blue) and German (red) fleets on 31 May – 1 June 1916

In an attempt to lure out and destroy a portion of the Grand Fleet, the German High Seas Fleet departed the Jade Bight early on the morning of 31 May 1916 in support of Hipper's battlecruisers which were to act as bait. Room 40 had intercepted and decrypted German radio traffic containing plans of the operation, so the Admiralty ordered the Grand Fleet to sortie the night before to cut off and destroy the High Seas Fleet.

Once Jellicoe's ships had rendezvoused with the 2nd Battle Squadron, coming from Cromarty, Scotland, on the morning of 31 May, he organised the main body of the Grand Fleet in parallel columns of divisions of four dreadnoughts each. The two divisions of the 2nd Battle Squadron were on his left (east), the 4th Battle Squadron was in the centre and the 1st Battle Squadron on the right. When Jellicoe ordered the Grand Fleet to deploy to the left and form line astern in anticipation of encountering the High Seas Fleet, this naturally placed the 2nd Battle Squadron at the head of the line of battle. The sisters were able to fire a few volleys at the battlecruisers of the I Scouting Group without effect early in the battle, but the manoeuvers of their escorting light cruisers frequently blocked their views of the German ships. Coupled with the visibility problems from the smoke and mist, none of the King George Vs were able to fire more than 19 rounds from their main guns.

=== Subsequent activity ===
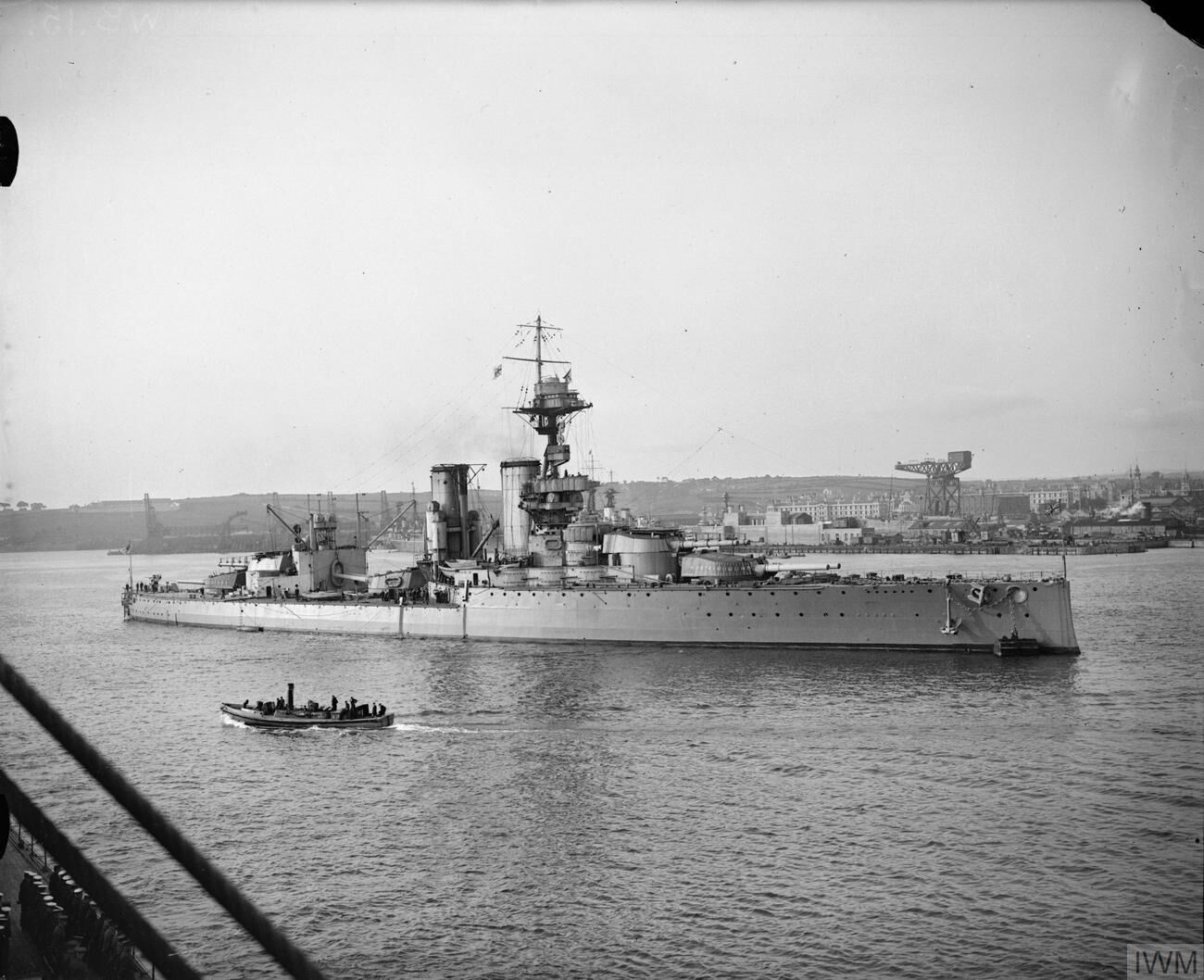
Centurion at Rosyth, Scotland, 1918

The Grand Fleet sortied on 18 August 1916 to ambush the High Seas Fleet while it advanced into the southern North Sea, but a series of miscommunications and mistakes prevented Jellicoe from intercepting the German fleet before it returned to port. Two light cruisers were sunk by German U-boats during the operation, prompting Jellicoe to decide to not risk the major units of the fleet south of 55° 30' North due to the prevalence of German submarines and mines. The Admiralty concurred and stipulated that the Grand Fleet would not sortie unless the German fleet was attempting an invasion of Britain or there was a strong possibility it could be forced into an engagement under suitable conditions. Along with the rest of the Grand Fleet, they sortied on the afternoon of 23 April 1918 after radio transmissions revealed that the High Seas Fleet was at sea after a failed attempt to intercept the regular British convoy to Norway. The Germans were too far ahead of the British to be caught, and no shots were fired. The sisters were present at Rosyth, Scotland, when the German fleet surrendered there on 21 November.

=== Postwar activities ===
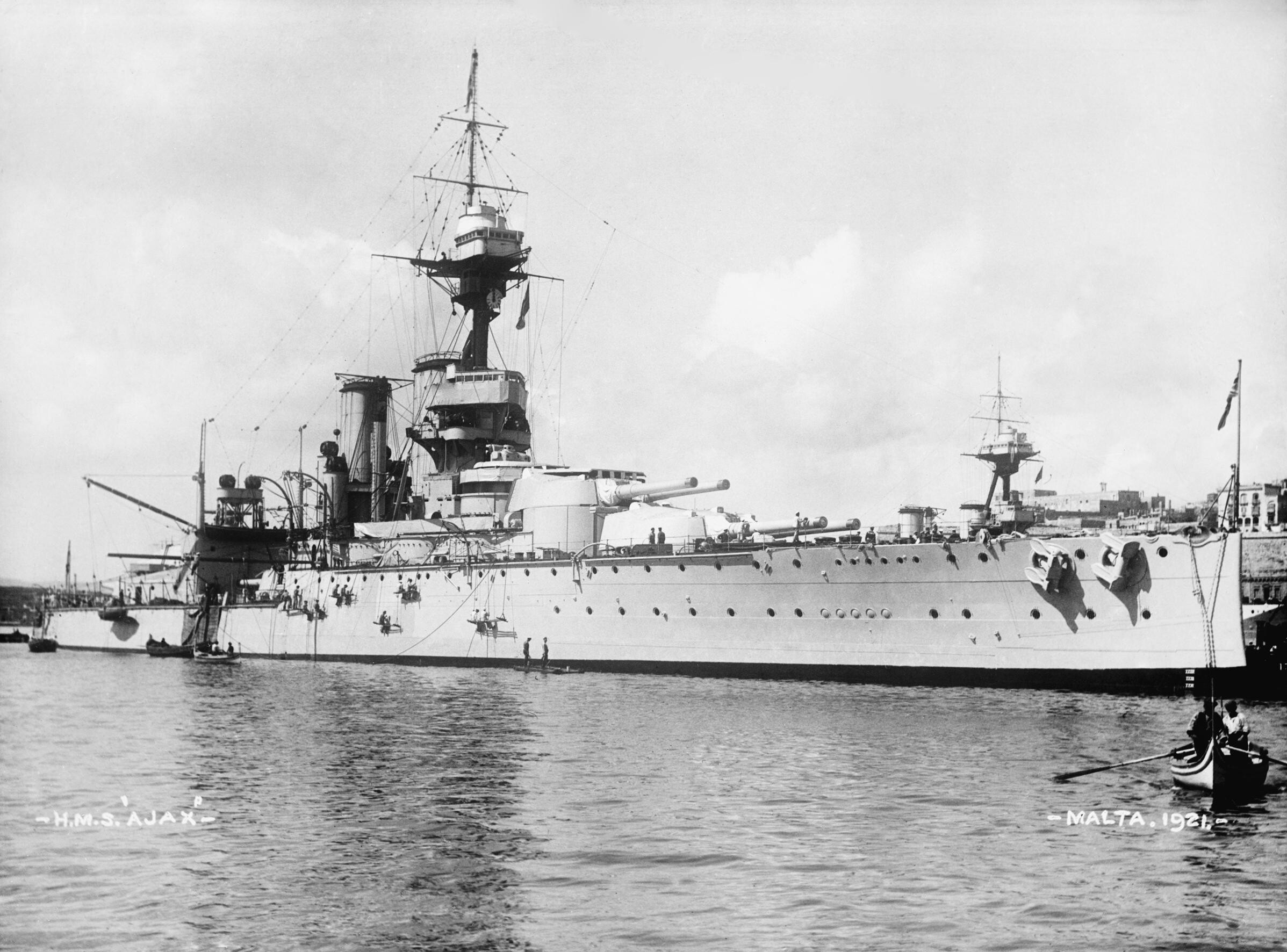
Ajax's crew painting ship, Grand Harbour, Valletta, Malta, 1921

The sisters remained with the 2nd Battle Squadron into early 1919, after which King George V became the flagship of the 3rd Battle Squadron until that unit was disbanded later that year. The ship then became flagship of the Reserve Fleet and served until late 1920. In the meantime, Ajax had been transferred to 4th Battle Squadron of the Mediterranean Fleet by mid-1919 and sometimes served as the Fleet's flagship. Centurion followed in early 1920, although she spent a lot of time in reserve in Malta. The sisters played minor roles in the Allied intervention in the Russian Civil War in the Black Sea in 1919–1920. King George V joined them in the 4th Battle Squadron in early 1921. After striking a rock in early September 1922, she was in Smyrna, Turkey, receiving temporary repairs when the Great Fire of Smyrna occurred later that month and evacuated some refugees when she sailed for permanent repairs at Malta. Her sisters were in Turkish waters during the Chanak Crisis around the same time. King George V was the first of the trio to return home in early 1923 and she served a training ship until she was sold for scrap at the end of 1926. Ajax and Centurion followed in April 1924, although they were placed in reserve, with the latter serving as the flagship of the Reserve Fleet. Like King George V, Ajax was sold for scrap at the end of 1926.

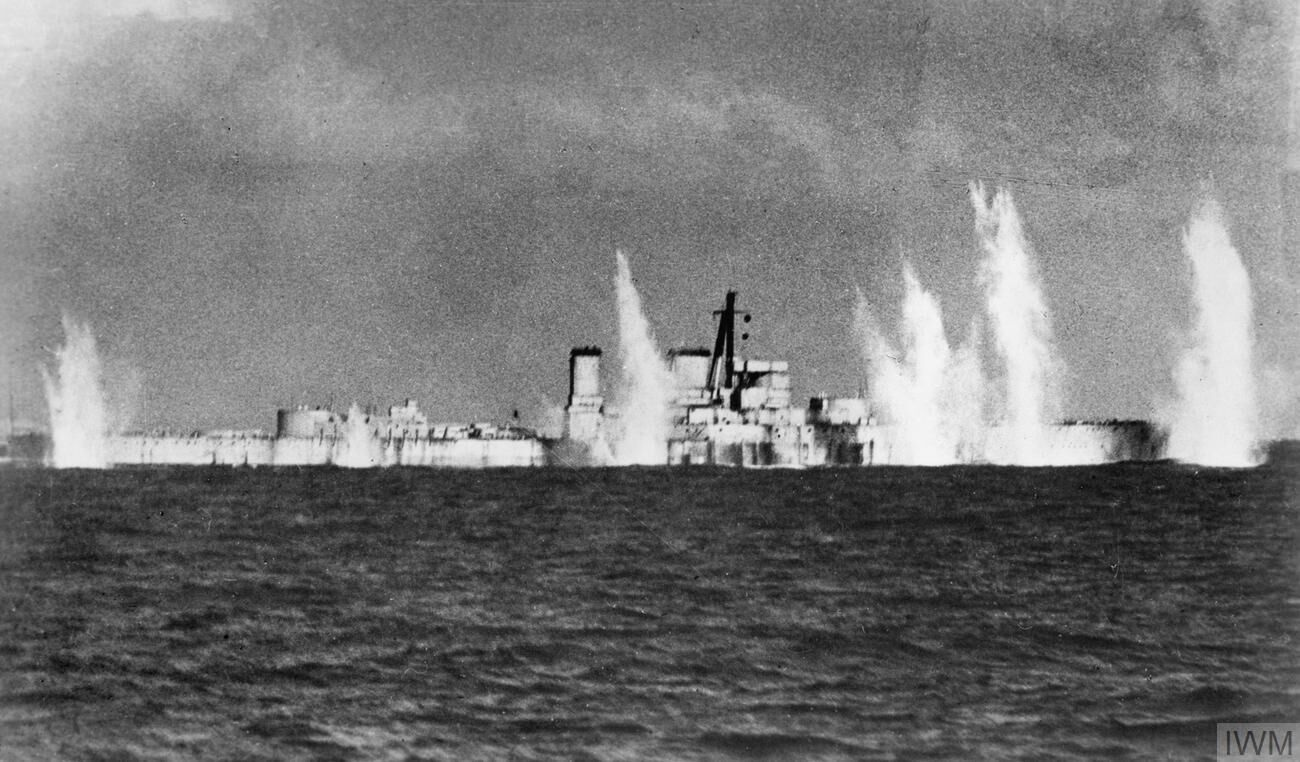
Centurion under fire, 1934

The British tonnage allowance granted by the Washington Naval Treaty permitted them to keep the three sisters in service until the two Nelson-class battleships were completed in 1927. While King George V and Ajax were scrapped, Centurion was demilitarized by the removal of her armament and was converted into a radio-controlled target ship. In addition to being used as a target for surface ships, Centurion was used to evaluate the effectiveness of various types of aerial bombing. During the Second World War, she was rearmed with light weapons and was converted into a blockship in 1941. In preparation for that operation (subsequently cancelled), she was modified into a decoy with dummy gun turrets in an attempt to fool the Axis powers. Centurion was sent to the Mediterranean in 1942 to escort a convoy to Malta, although the Italians may have figured out the deception. The ship was scuttled off Omaha Beach in June 1944 to form a breakwater to protect a mulberry harbour built to supply the forces ashore.

== Bibliography ==
- Brooks, John (2005). Dreadnought Gunnery and the Battle of Jutland: The Question of Fire Control. London: Routledge. ISBN 0-415-40788-5.
- Brooks, John (1995). "The Mast and Funnel Question: Fire-control Positions in British Dreadnoughts". In Roberts, John (ed.). Warship 1995. London: Conway Maritime Press. pp. 40–60. ISBN 0-85177-654-X.
- Brooks, John (1996). "Percy Scott and the Director". In McLean, David; Antony, Preston (eds.). Warship 1996. London: Conway Maritime Press. pp. 150–170. ISBN 0-85177-685-X.
- Brown, David K. (2000). Nelson to Vanguard: Warship Design and Development 1923-1945. London: Chatham Publishing. ISBN 1-55750-492-X.
- Burt, R. A. (1986). British Battleships of World War One. Annapolis, Maryland: Naval Institute Press. ISBN 0-87021-863-8.
- Campbell, N. J. M. (1986). Jutland: An Analysis of the Fighting. Annapolis, Maryland: Naval Institute Press. ISBN 0-87021-324-5.
- Corbett, Julian (1997) [1940]. Naval Operations. History of the Great War: Based on Official Documents. Vol. III (Second ed.). London and Nashville, Tennessee: Imperial War Museum in association with the Battery Press. ISBN 1-870423-50-X.
- Friedman, Norman (2015). The British Battleship 1906–1946. Barnsley, UK: Seaforth Publishing. ISBN 978-1-84832-225-7.
- Friedman, Norman (2011). Naval Weapons of World War One: Guns, Torpedoes, Mines and ASW Weapons of All Nations; An Illustrated Directory. Barnsley, UK: Seaforth Publishing. ISBN 978-1-84832-100-7.
- Goldrick, James (2015). Before Jutland: The Naval War in Northern European Waters, August 1914–February 1915. Annapolis, Maryland: Naval Institute Press. ISBN 978-1-59114-349-9.
- Halpern, Paul, ed. (2011). The Mediterranean Fleet, 1919–1929. Publications of the Navy Records Society. Vol. 158. Farnham: Ashgate for the Navy Records Society. ISBN 978-1-4094-2756-8.
- Halpern, Paul G. (1995). A Naval History of World War I. Annapolis, Maryland: Naval Institute Press. ISBN 1-55750-352-4.
- Hampshire, A. Cecil (1960). The Phantom Fleet. London: William Kimber & Company. OCLC 654265193.
- Jellicoe, John (1919). The Grand Fleet, 1914–1916: Its Creation, Development, and Work. New York: George H. Doran Company. OCLC 13614571.
- Massie, Robert K. (2003). Castles of Steel: Britain, Germany, and the Winning of the Great War at Sea. New York: Random House. ISBN 0-679-45671-6.
- Parkes, Oscar (1990) [1966]. British Battleships, Warrior 1860 to Vanguard 1950: A History of Design, Construction, and Armament (New & rev. ed.). Annapolis, Maryland: Naval Institute Press. ISBN 1-55750-075-4.
- Preston, Antony (1985). "Great Britain and Empire Forces". In Gray, Randal (ed.). Conway's All the World's Fighting Ships 1906–1921. Annapolis, Maryland: Naval Institute Press. pp. 1–104. ISBN 0-85177-245-5.
- Tarrant, V. E. (1999) [1995]. Jutland: The German Perspective: A New View of the Great Battle, 31 May 1916. London: Brockhampton Press. ISBN 1-86019-917-8.
