= BL 13.5-inch Mk V naval gun =

BL 13.5 inch Mk V gun
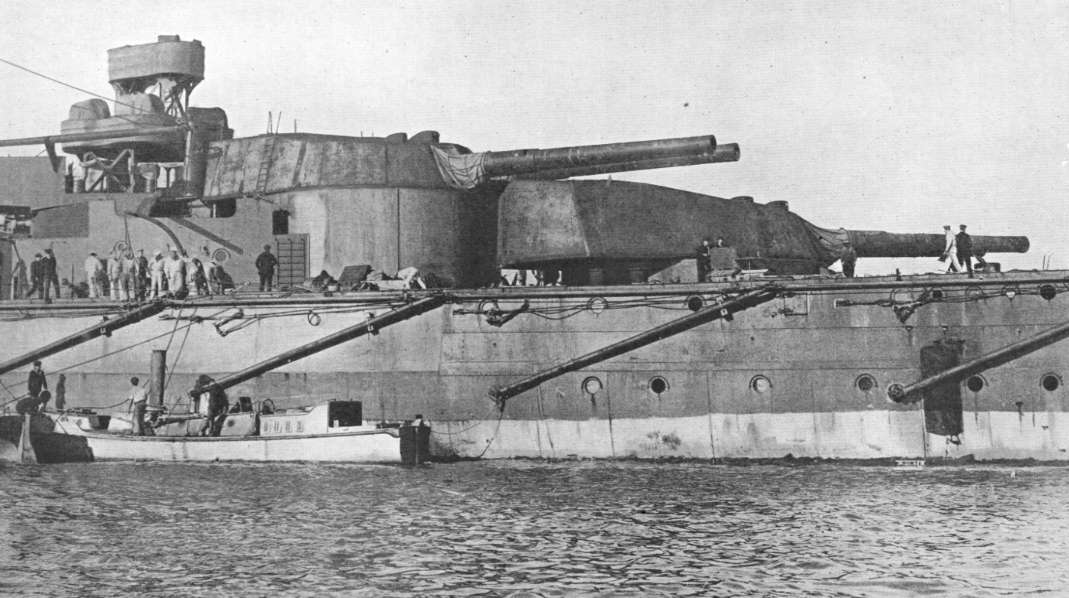
- Rear turrets of HMS Thunderer
- Type: Naval gun
- Place of origin: United Kingdom

Service history
- In service: 1912 - 1940s (as railway gun)
- Used by: United Kingdom
- Wars: World War I World War II

Production history
- Designer: Vickers
- Designed: 1909
- Variants: Mk V(L); Mk V(H)

Specifications
- Mass: 167,776 lbs (75 long tons or 76.102 tonnes)
- Barrel length: Bore 50 ft 6 in (15.392 m) (45 cal)
- Shell: H: 1,400 lb (635.03 kg); L: 1,250 lb (566.99 kg) HE, AP (Note: The gun had a Heavy (H) shell of 1,400 lb (640 kg) and a Light (L) shell of 1,250 lb (570 kg). Some guns were designated H or L to make clear they were intended for the heavy or light shell.)
- Calibre: 13.5-inch (342.9 mm)
- Elevation: Naval: 0° - 20° Railway: 0° - 40°
- Muzzle velocity: H: 2,491 ft/s (759 m/s); L: 2,582 ft/s (787 m/s)
- Maximum firing range: H: 23,740 yards (21,710 m) at 20° L: 23,820 yards (21,780 m) at 20° H: 40,600 yards (37,120 m) at 40° (World War II railway gun, with Super Charge)

The BL (Breech Loading) 13.5 inch Mk V gun (Note: Mk V = Mark 5. Britain used Roman numerals to identify Marks (models) of ordnance until after World War II. This was the fifth model of British 13.5 inch gun) was a British heavy naval gun, introduced in 1912 as the main armament for the new super-dreadnought battleships of the Orion class. The calibre was 13.5 inches (343 mm) and the barrels were 45 calibres long at 607.5 inches (15.43 m). The guns were greatly superior to the unrelated earlier 13.5-inch (30-calibre) Mk I to Mk IV guns used on the pre-dreadnought battleship Admiral, Trafalgar and Royal Sovereign classes completed between 1888 and 1896.

== Background ==
The gun was developed in response to the relative failure of the British high-velocity 12-inch Mk XI and XII guns. Unlike Germany, which developed and deployed successful high-velocity 12-inch guns, Britain in this case switched to guns firing larger and heavier shells at lower velocity which could achieve similar performance in range and armour penetration but could deliver a heavier explosive charge on impact.

== Characteristics ==
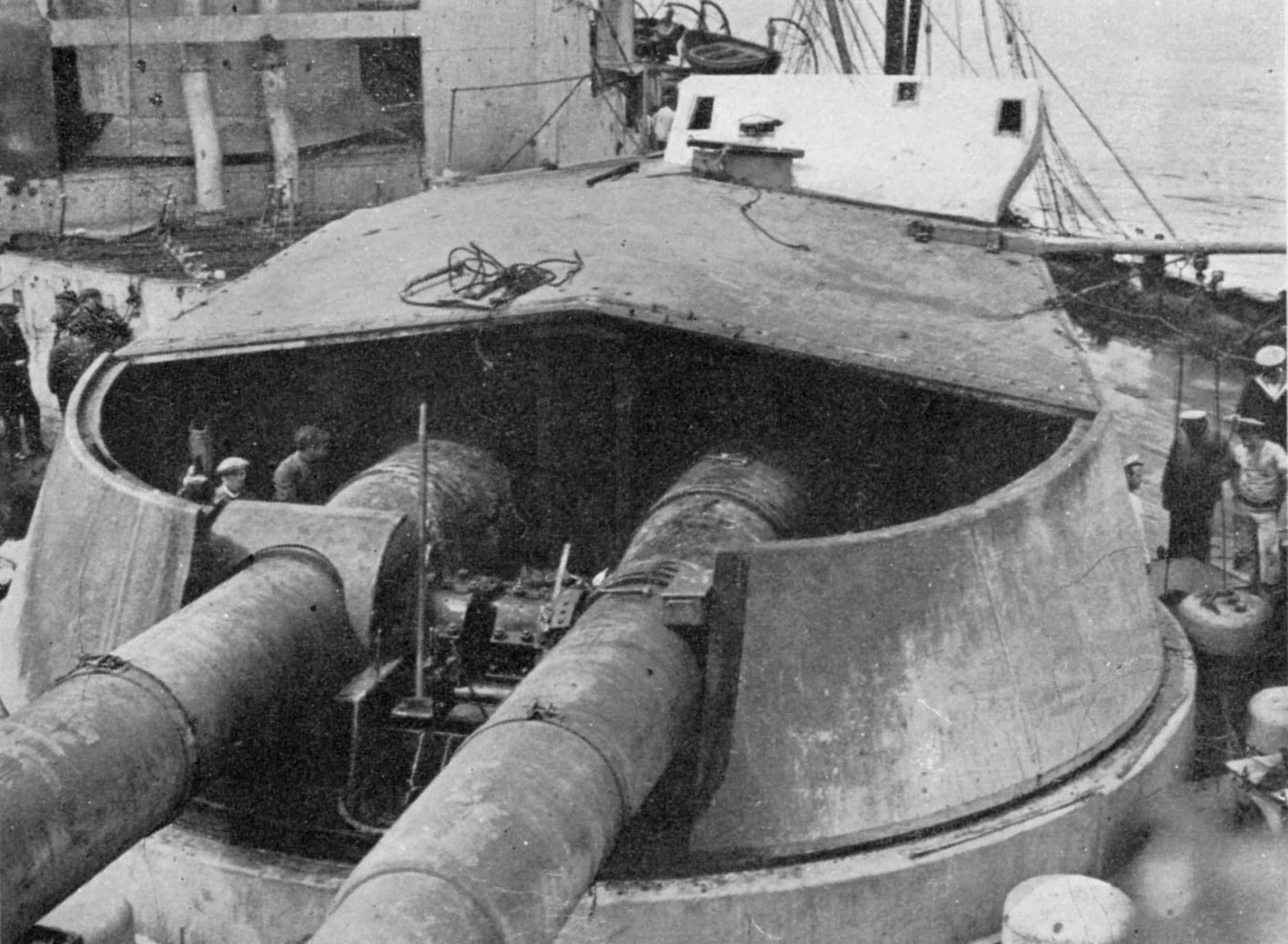
Q turret of the battlecruiser HMS Lion in June 1916 after damage at the Battle of Jutland. The turret mounted two 13.5-inch (343 mm) Mark V guns.

The gun was wire-wound and weighed approximately 168,000 lb (76 tonnes) (excluding the breech), and in its original form fired a 1,250 lb (567 kg) armour-piercing capped (APC) or high-explosive (HE) round a distance of 23,800 yards (21,800 m) at a 20-degree elevation.

== Variants ==
Due to the excellent characteristics of the gun, it was decided to increase the weight of shell to 1,400 lb (635 kg), with an increased firing charge to achieve about the same range. The gun firing the lighter shell was designated Mark V(L) (for "light") by the Royal Navy, and the 1,400 lb version Mark V(H) (for "heavy").

=== Railway guns ===
In 1939 three WW1 BL 14 inch Railway Guns (named Gladiator, Piece Maker and Scene Shifter) were removed from storage at Royal Army Ordnance Corps Chilwell and recommissioned. The original 14 inch gun barrels had long since been scrapped, so they were fitted with BL 13.5 inch Mark V gun barrels from the Royal Navy's Iron Duke class reserves, which had been designed close enough to the dimensions of the 14 inch barrels to fit. In 1940 these guns were issued to the Royal Marine Siege Regiment at Dover in Kent to bombard German batteries and shipping in the Calais area. They could be stored in railway tunnels when not in use to protect them from attack.

=== Experimental hypervelocity gun ===
A 13.5/8-inch hypervelocity gun (a type of very large-calibre artillery) for stratospheric experiments was developed and deployed near St Margaret's in Kent. The weapon was a 13.5 inch gun Mark V lined down to 8 inches; the liner projected several feet beyond the 13.5 inch barrel. The concept was suggested by Frederick Lindemann (Lord Cherwell), Winston Churchill's scientific advisor. Due to its deployment near the heavy cross-Channel guns and manning by the Royal Marine Siege Regiment, it is often erroneously assumed to have been intended as a cross-Channel gun. It was initially named Wilfred, but this was soon changed to Bruce, after Admiral Sir Bruce Fraser. The projectiles were custom-made with external rifling to match the gun's rifling, with tighter tolerances than normal; this resulted in the need for a screwdriver-type tool to ram the projectiles. The rate of fire was very low as a result; but this was not a major concern in an experimental piece. Both high explosive and high velocity shells were made for the gun; the high velocity shell was a smoke shell, intended to burst at high altitude. Observations of the smoke were used to study conditions in the stratosphere. The gun was first test-fired in June 1942 at the Isle of Grain, also in Kent. The gun was deployed near St. Margaret's on 21 January 1943, and experimental firing commenced on 30 March 1943. Successful experiments with smoke shells were conducted in February 1944. The intended burst zone for the smoke shells was 30 miles (48 km) horizontally from the gun and at 95,000 feet (29,000 m) altitude. These trials resulted in the need for a new barrel or liner; the replacement took about two weeks. The data from these experiments was important in the development of the Grand Slam bomb. After further experimental firings, the weapon was taken out of service in February 1945.

== Service ==
British warships with the BL 13.5 inch /45 gun;

- Orion-class battleships: Mark V(L)
- King George V-class battleships of 1911: Mark V(H)
- Iron Duke-class battleships: Mark V(H)
- HMS Erin, a battleship: Mark VI(H)
- Lion-class battlecruisers: Mark V(L)
- HMS Queen Mary, a battlecruiser: Mark V(H)
- HMS Tiger, a battlecruiser: Mark V(H)

== See also ==
- BL 15-inch Mk I naval gun British successor
- List of naval guns
- Cross-Channel guns in the Second World War - 13.5 inch and other large guns deployed in Kent, also German equivalents

=== Weapons of comparable role, performance and era ===
- 340mm/45 Modèle 1912 gun French equivalent

== Bibliography ==
- DiGiulian, Tony, British 13.5"/45 (34.3 cm) Mark V(L) 13.5"/45 (34.3 cm) Mark V(H)
- Flower, Stephen (2004). Barnes Wallis' Bombs. Strood: Tempus Publishing Ltd. ISBN 0-7524-2987-6.
- Maurice-Jones, K. W. (2009). The History of Coast Artillery in the British Army. Uckfield, East Sussex: The Naval & Military Press Ltd. ISBN 978-1-8457-4031-3.
