= 3rd Battlecruiser Squadron =

Former battlecruiser formation of the Royal Navy

- White Ensign
- Active: 1915–1916
- Country: United Kingdom
- Allegiance: British Empire
- Branch: Royal Navy

Commanders
- Notable commanders: Rear Admiral Sir Horace Hood

The 3rd Battlecruiser Squadron was a short-lived Royal Navy squadron of battlecruisers that saw service as part of the Grand Fleet during the First World War.

== History ==
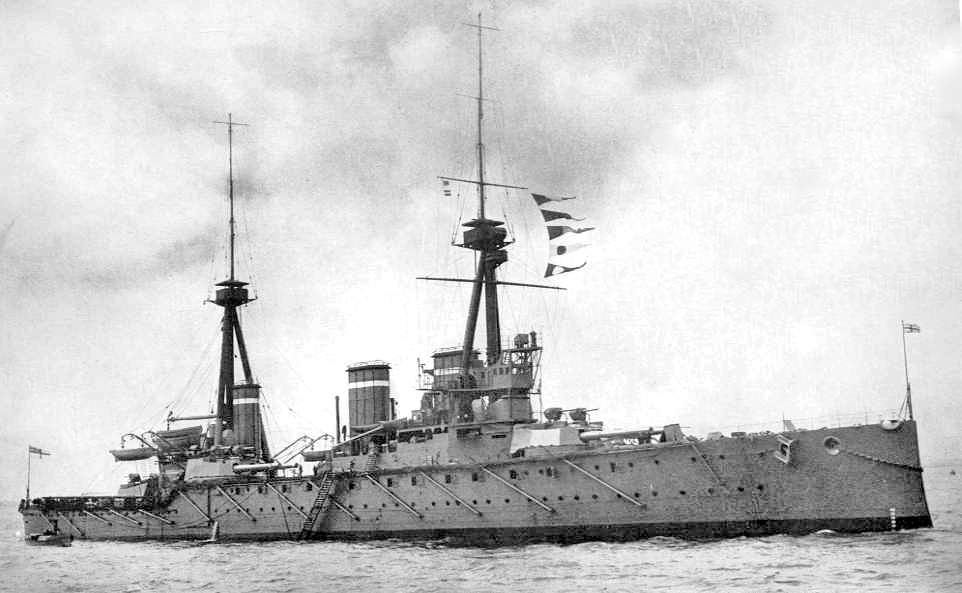
HMS Invincible

The 3rd Battlecruiser Squadron was created in 1915, with the return to home waters of two of the three Invincible-class battlecruisers—Invincible and Inflexible—following the Battle of the Falkland Islands and the Dardanelles operation. They were joined by their sister Indomitable, and, under the command of Rear Admiral Sir Horace Hood, the squadron was based at Rosyth, Scotland.

=== Battle of Jutland ===
- Invincible - flagship of Rear Admiral the Honourable H. L. A. Hood; Captain A. L. Cay
- Inflexible - Captain E. H. F. Heaton-Ellis
- Indomitable - Captain F. W. Kennedy

On 31 May 1916, the squadron—attached to the Grand Fleet rather than David Beatty's Battlecruiser Fleet—participated in the Battle of Jutland. During the battle, Invincible was hit in her "Q" turret by a salvo from the German battlecruiser SMS Lützow, causing a massive explosion. The ship broke in two and sank with the loss of all but six of her crew of 1,021. Admiral Hood was among the dead.

=== After Jutland ===
With the loss of Invincible and several other battlecruisers at Jutland, the squadron was no longer required. Indomitable and Inflexible were transferred to the 2nd Battlecruiser Squadron in June 1916.

== Rear-Admirals commanding ==
Post holders included:

	Rank	Flag	Name	Term	Notes
Rear-Admiral Commanding, 3rd Battle Cruiser Squadron
1	Rear-Admiral	Rear-Admiral - Royal Navy	the Hon. Horace L. A. Hood	May 1915-May 1916	

== Sources ==
- Dittmar, Frederick J; Colledge, J J (1972). British Warships 1914–1919. London: Ian Allan Publishing. ISBN 978-0-7110-0380-4.
- Macintyre, Donald (1958). Jutland. New York: W. W. Norton. OCLC 1238447.
