= 2nd Battlecruiser Squadron =

Former battlecruiser formation of the Royal Navy

- White Ensign
- Active: 1915–1919
- Country: United Kingdom
- Allegiance: British Empire
- Branch: Royal Navy

Commanders
- Notable commanders: Rear Admiral W. C. Pakenham

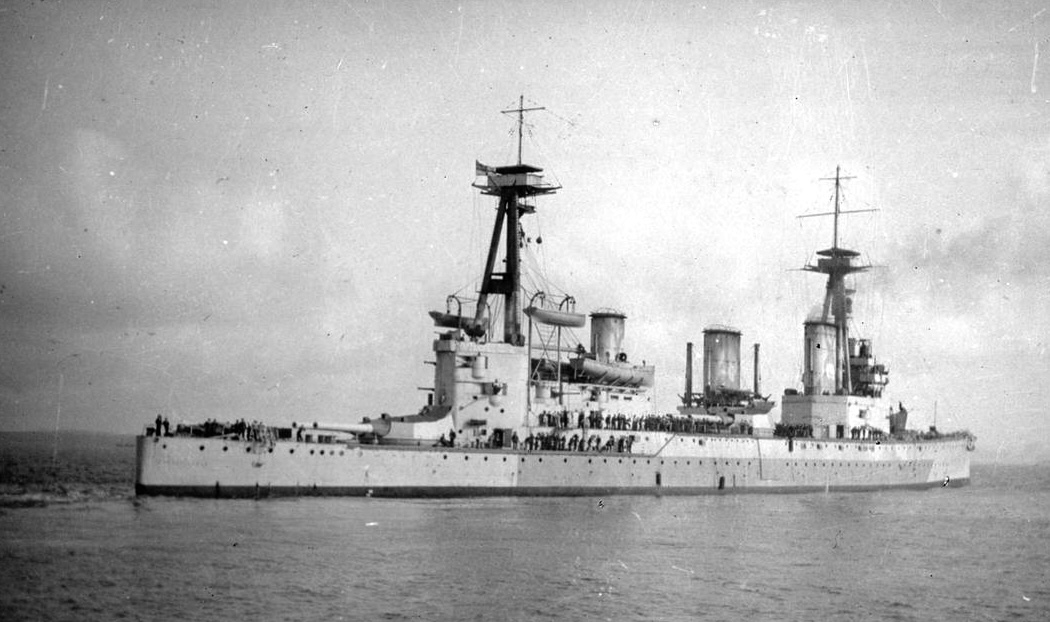
HMS Indefatigable

The 2nd Battlecruiser Squadron was a Royal Navy squadron of battlecruisers that saw service as part of the Grand Fleet during the First World War.

== August 1914 ==
In August 1914, the 2nd Battlecruiser Squadron was in the Mediterranean, and consisted of:

- HMS Inflexible
- HMS Indomitable
- HMS Indefatigable

== 1915 ==
On 15 January 1915, HMS New Zealand became flagship of the 2nd BCS. She was replaced as flagship by the Australian battlecruiser HMAS Australia on 8 February 1915.

With the transfer of HMS Inflexible and Indomitable to the newly created 3rd Battlecruiser Squadron during 1915, the squadron was left with three ships, namely HMS New Zealand and Indefatigable, and HMAS Australia.

== Battle of Jutland ==
HMAS Australia was damaged in collision with HMS New Zealand on 22 April 1916, and did not participate in the Battle of Jutland on 31 May 1916. The 2nd BCS therefore consisted of:

- HMS New Zealand Flagship of Rear Admiral W. C. Pakenham; Captain J. F. E. Green
- HMS Indefatigable Captain C. F. Sowerby

HMS New Zealand sustained light damage during the engagement; however, HMS Indefatigable was sunk by the German battlecruiser Von der Tann.

== After Jutland ==
With the loss of three battlecruisers at Jutland, the Royal Navy reverted to two Battlecruiser squadrons. For the remainder of the war, the squadron comprised:

- HMAS Australia
- HMS New Zealand
- HMS Inflexible
- HMS Indomitable

== Rear-Admirals commanding ==
Post holders included:

| | Rank | Flag | Name | Term | Notes |
|---|---|---|---|---|---|
Rear-Admiral Commanding, 2nd Battle Cruiser Squadron
| 1 | Rear-Admiral | Rear-Admiral - Royal Navy | Sir Archibald G. H.W. Moore | January–February 1915 | |
| 2 | Rear-Admiral | Rear-Admiral - Royal Navy | Sir George Edwin Patey | February–March 1915 | |
| 3 | Rear-Admiral | Rear-Admiral - Royal Navy | Sir William C. Pakenham | 1 March 1915 – December 1916 | |
| 4 | Rear-Admiral | Rear-Admiral - Royal Navy | Sir Arthur C. Leveson | December 1916 – September 1918 | |
| 5 | Rear-Admiral | Rear-Admiral - Royal Navy | Sir Lionel Halsey | September 1918 – March 1919 | |
| 6 | Rear-Admiral | Rear-Admiral - Royal Navy | Henry Oliver | 14 March 1918 – March 1919 | |
