= HMS Indomitable (1907) =

1907 Invincible-class battlecruiser of the Royal Navy

- Illustration of Indomitable in 1908

History

United Kingdom
- Name: Indomitable
- Ordered: 1906 Naval Programme
- Builder: Fairfield Shipbuilding and Engineering Company, Govan
- Laid down: 1 March 1906
- Launched: 16 March 1907
- Commissioned: 25 June 1908
- Out of service: February 1919
- Stricken: 31 March 1920
- Fate: Sold for scrap, 1 December 1921

General characteristics
- Class & type: Invincible-class battlecruiser
- Displacement: 17,408 long tons (17,687 t) (normal); 20,722 long tons (21,055 t) (deep load)
- Length: 567 ft (172.8 m)
- Beam: 78 ft 7.75 in (23.97 m)
- Draught: 29 ft 9.5 in (9.08 m) (deep load)
- Installed power: 31 Babcock & Wilcox boilers; 41,000 shp (31,000 kW)
- Propulsion: 4 shafts, 2 steam turbine sets
- Speed: 25.5 knots (47.2 km/h; 29.3 mph)
- Range: 3,090 nmi (5,720 km; 3,560 mi) at 10 knots (19 km/h; 12 mph)
- Complement: 784 (up to 1000 in wartime)
- Armament: 4 × twin 12 in (305 mm) guns; 16 × single 4 in (102 mm) guns; 5 × 18 in (450 mm) torpedo tubes
- Armour: Belt: 4–6 in (102–152 mm); Decks: 1.5–2.5 in (38–64 mm); Barbettes: 7 in (178 mm); Turrets: 7 in (178 mm); Conning tower: 6–10 in (152–254 mm); Torpedo bulkheads: 2.5 in (64 mm)

HMS Indomitable was one of three Invincible-class battlecruisers built for the Royal Navy before World War I and had an active career during the war. She tried to hunt down the German ships Goeben and Breslau in the Mediterranean when war broke out and bombarded Turkish fortifications protecting the Dardanelles even before the British declared war on Turkey in the Pursuit of Goeben and Breslau She helped to sink the German armoured cruiser Blücher during the Battle of Dogger Bank in 1915 and towed the damaged British battlecruiser HMS Lion to safety after the battle. She damaged the German battlecruisers Seydlitz and Derfflinger during the Battle of Jutland in mid-1916 and watched her sister ship HMS Invincible explode. Deemed obsolete after the war, she was sold for scrap in 1921.

== Design ==
=== General characteristics ===
The Invincible-class ships were formally known as armoured cruisers until 1911 when they were redesignated as battlecruisers by an Admiralty order of 24 November 1911. Unofficially a number of designations were used until then, including "cruiser-battleship", "dreadnought cruiser" and "battle-cruiser".

Indomitable was significantly larger than her armoured cruiser predecessors of the Minotaur class. She had an overall length of 567 feet (172.8 m), a beam of 78 feet 7.75 inches (24.0 m), and a draft of 30 feet (9.1 m) at deep load. She displaced 17,250 long tons (17,530 t) at normal load and 20,420 long tons (20,750 t) at deep load, nearly 3,000 long tons (3,000 t) more than the earlier ships.

=== Propulsion ===
Indomitable had two paired sets of Parsons direct-drive turbines. The turbines were designed to produce a total of 41,000 shaft horsepower (31,000 kW), but reached nearly 48,000 shp (36,000 kW) during trials in 1908. Indomitable was designed for a speed of 25 knots (46 km/h; 29 mph), but reached 26.1 knots (48.3 km/h; 30.0 mph) during trials. She maintained an average speed of 25.3 knots (46.9 km/h; 29.1 mph) for three days during a passage of the North Atlantic in August 1908.

The steam plant comprised 31 Babcock & Wilcox water-tube boilers arranged in four boiler rooms. Maximum bunkerage was 3,083 long tons (3,132 t) of coal, and an additional 713 long tons (724 t) of fuel oil that was to be sprayed on the coal to increase its burn rate. At full fuel capacity, she could steam for 3,090 nautical miles (5,720 km; 3,560 mi) at a speed of 10 knots (19 km/h; 12 mph).

=== Armament ===
Indomitable mounted eight BL 12-inch (305 mm) Mk X guns in four twin hydraulically powered turrets. Her secondary armament consisted of sixteen 4 in (102 mm) QF Mk III guns. During 1915 the turret roof guns were transferred to the superstructure and the total number of guns was reduced to twelve. All of the remaining guns were enclosed in casemates and given blast shields at that time to better protect the gun crews from weather and enemy action. The QF Mk III guns were replaced by twelve 4-inch BL MK VII guns during 1917.

Her anti-aircraft armament consisted of a single QF 3 inch 20 cwt AA gun on a high-angle MKII mount at the aft end of the superstructure that was carried from July 1915. A 3-pounder Hotchkiss gun on a high-angle MkIc mounting with a maximum elevation of 60° was also mounted in November 1914 and used until August 1917. A 4-inch BL MK VII on a high-angle mount was added in April 1917. Five 18-inch (450 mm) submerged torpedo tubes were fitted on the Invincibles, two on each side and one in the stern. Fourteen torpedoes were carried for them.

=== Armour ===
The Invincible's waterline belt had a maximum thickness 6 inches (152 mm) amidships. The belt was 6 inches thick roughly between the fore and aft 12-inch gun turrets, but was reduced to four inches from the fore turret to the bow, but did not extend aft of the rear turret. The gun turrets and barbettes were protected by 7 inches (178 mm) of armour, except for the turret roofs which used 3 inches (76 mm) of Krupp non-cemented armour (KNC). The thickness of the main deck was 1–2 inches (25–51 mm) and the lower deck armour was 1.5–2.5 inches (38–64 mm). Mild steel torpedo bulkheads of 2.5-inch thickness were fitted abreast the magazines and shell rooms.

After the Battle of Jutland revealed her vulnerability to plunging shellfire, additional armour was added in the area of the magazines and to the turret roofs. The exact thickness is not known, but it was unlikely to be thick as the total amount was less than 100 long tons (102 t).

== Construction and service history ==
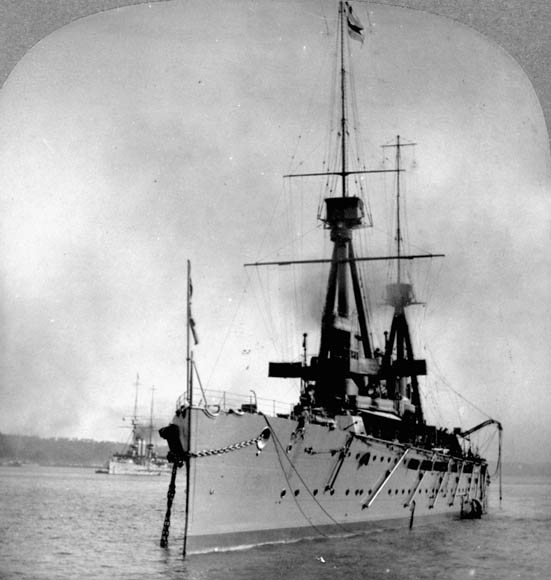
Indomitable during the celebrations of the tercentenary of Quebec City in 1908

She was built by Fairfield Shipbuilding & Engineering at Govan. She was laid down on 1 March 1906 and launched on 16 March 1907. She was commissioned on 25 June 1908 before she was fully complete to carry the Prince of Wales to Canada.

Immediately after commissioning, Indomitable embarked the Prince of Wales (soon to be King George V) for the Quebec Tercentenary celebration. On her return voyage, "…her average was a fraction below 25 knots, almost equalling the record for an Atlantic crossing of 25.08 knots, set by the liner RMS Lusitania". She returned on 10 August and was immediately returned to her builders for final completion. She was assigned to the Nore Division of the Home Fleet on 28 October and assigned to the 1st Cruiser Squadron (CS) in March 1909. She became the flagship of Rear-Admiral S. Colville, commanding the 1st CS, on 26 July. She was refitted several times between 1910 and 1913 before she was transferred to the Mediterranean on 27 August 1913 to form the 2nd Battlecruiser Squadron (BCS) with her sister ship Invincible. She was slightly damaged in a collision in Stokes Bay with the minelayer C4 on 17 March 1913. She was refitting in Malta in July 1914 when the deepening crisis forced the Navy to cut short her refit.

=== World War I ===
==== Pursuit of Goeben and Breslau ====
Indomitable, accompanied by HMS Indefatigable, under the command of Admiral Sir Archibald Berkeley Milne encountered the German battlecruiser Goeben and the light cruiser Breslau on the morning of 4 August 1914 headed east after a cursory bombardment of the French Algerian port of Philippeville, but Britain and Germany were not yet at war so Milne turned to shadow the Germans as they headed back to Messina to recoal. All three battlecruisers had problems with their boilers, but Goeben and Breslau were able to break contact and reached Messina by the morning of the 5th. By this time war had been declared, after the German invasion of Belgium, but an Admiralty order to respect Italian neutrality and stay outside a six-mile (10 km) limit from the Italian coast precluded entrance into the passage of the Strait of Messina where they could observe the port directly. Therefore, Milne stationed Inflexible and Indefatigable at the northern exit of the Strait of Messina, still expecting the Germans to break out to the west where they could attack French troop transports, the light cruiser Gloucester at the southern exit and sent Indomitable to recoal at Bizerte where she was better positioned to react to a German sortie into the Western Mediterranean.

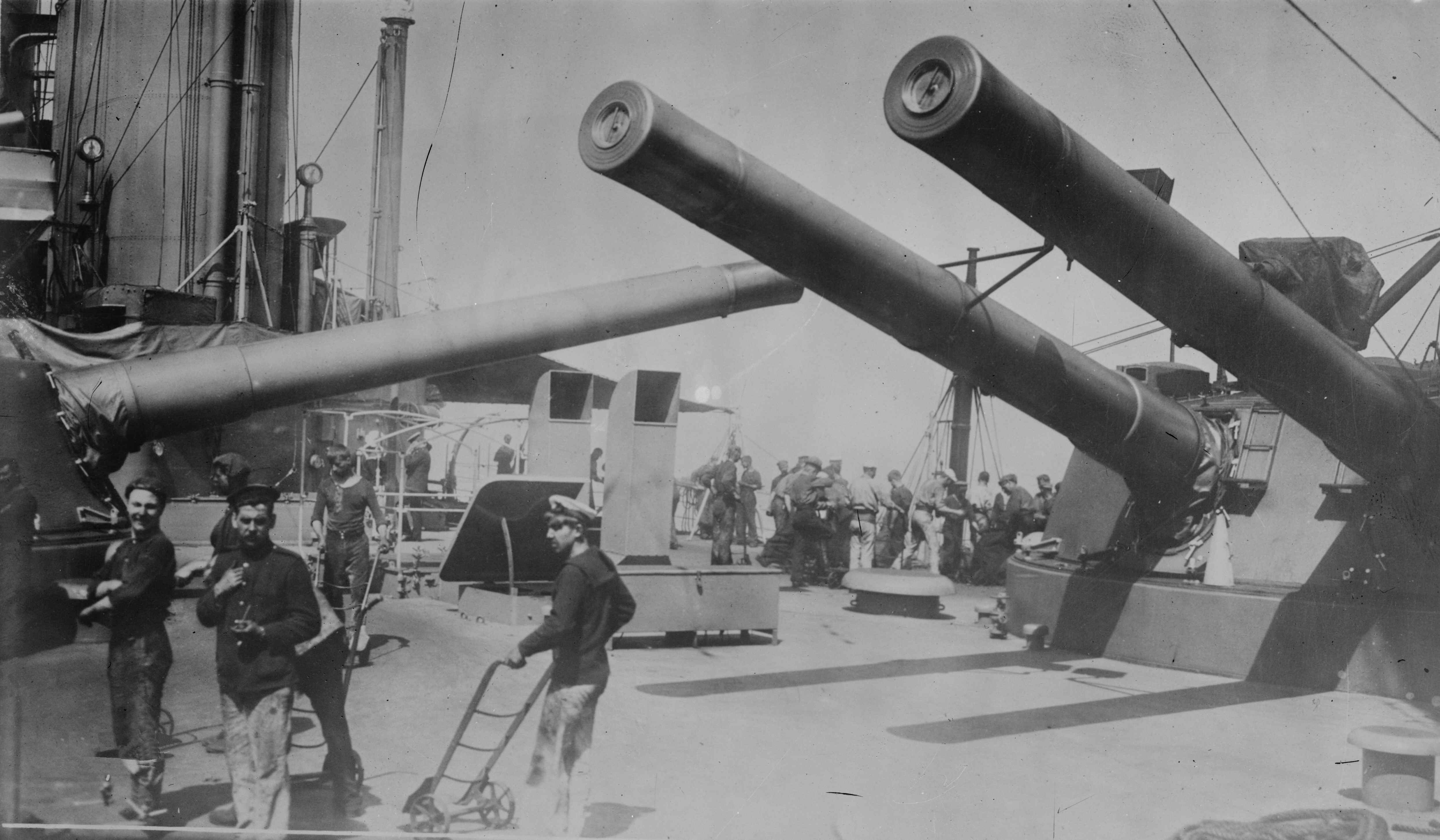
Indomitable with 12 inch guns turned amidships

The Germans sortied from Messina on 6 August and headed east, towards Constantinople, trailed by Gloucester. Milne, still expecting Rear Admiral Wilhelm Souchon to turn west, kept the battlecruisers at Malta until shortly after midnight on 8 August when he set sail for Cape Matapan at a leisurely 12 knots (22 km/h), where Goeben had been spotted eight hours earlier. At 2:30 PM he received an incorrect signal from the Admiralty stating that Britain was at war with Austria—war would not be declared until 12 August and the order was countermanded four hours later, but Milne followed his standing orders to guard the Adriatic against an Austrian breakout attempt, rather than seek Goeben. Finally on 9 August Milne was given clear orders to "chase Goeben which had passed Cape Matapan on the 7th steering north-east." Milne still did not believe that Souchon was heading for the Dardanelles, and so he resolved to guard the exit from the Aegean, unaware that the Goeben did not intend to come out. Indomitable remained in the Mediterranean to blockade the Dardanelles, but Inflexible was ordered home on 18 August.

On 3 November 1914, Churchill ordered the first British attack on the Dardanelles following the opening of hostilities between Turkey and Russia. The attack was carried out by Indomitable and Indefatigable, as well as the French pre-dreadnought battleships Suffren and Vérité. The intention of the attack was to test the fortifications and measure the Turkish response. The results were deceptively encouraging. In a twenty-minute bombardment, a single shell struck the magazine of the fort at Sedd el Bahr at the tip of the Gallipoli peninsula, displacing (but not destroying) 10 guns and killing 86 Turkish soldiers. The most significant consequence was that the attention of the Turks was drawn to strengthening their defences, and they set about expanding the mine field. This attack actually took place before a formal declaration of war had been made by Britain against the Ottoman Empire which didn't happen until the 5th. Indomitable was ordered to return to England in December where she joined the 2nd BCS.

==== Battle of Dogger Bank ====
On 23 January 1915, a force of German battlecruisers under the command of Admiral Franz von Hipper sortied to clear the Dogger Bank of any British fishing boats or small craft that might be there to collect intelligence on German movements. But the British were reading their coded messages and sailed to intercept them with a larger force of British battlecruisers under the command of Admiral Beatty, which included Indomitable. Contact was initiated at 07:20 (Note: The times used in this section are in UTC, which is one hour behind CET, which is often used in German works.) on the 24th when the British light cruiser HMS Arethusa spotted the German light cruiser SMS Kolberg. By 07:35 the Germans had spotted Beatty's force and Hipper ordered a turn to the south at 20 knots (37 km/h; 23 mph), believing that this would suffice if the ships that he saw to his northwest were British battleships and that he could always increased speed to Blücher's maximum speed of 23 knots (43 km/h; 26 mph) if they were British battlecruisers.

Beatty ordered his battlecruisers to make all practicable speed to catch the Germans before they could escape. Indomitable managed to exceed 26 knots (48 km/h; 30 mph) and Beatty recognized her performance with a signal at 08:55 "Well done, Indomitable". Despite this achievement Indomitable was the slowest of Beatty's ships and gradually fell behind the newer and faster battlecruisers. By 10:48 Blücher had been heavily damaged by fire from all the other battlecruisers and her speed had dropped to 17 knots (31 km/h; 20 mph) and her steering gear had been jammed; Beatty ordered Indomitable to attack her. But due to a combination of a mistake by Beatty's flag lieutenant in signaling and heavy damage to Beatty's flagship Lion which had knocked out her radio and caused enough smoke to obscure her signal halyards so that Beatty couldn't communicate with his ships caused the rest of the battlecruisers to turn away from Hipper's main body and engage Blücher. Indomitable fired 134 shells at Blücher before she capsized and sank at 12:07. After the end of the battle Indomitable was ordered to tow Lion back to port as one of her engines had been knocked out, the other was failing and she'd been holed a number of times beneath the waterline. It took over a day and a half at speeds of 7–10 knots (13–19 km/h; 8.1–11.5 mph).

She was transferred to the 3rd Battlecruiser Squadron (BCS) in February 1915 although she was being repaired after an electrical fire at the time. Rear Admiral Horace Hood took command of the 3rd BCS on 27 May 1915. The 1st and 3rd BCS sortied in response to the German bombardment of Yarmouth and Lowestoft on 24–25 April 1916, but failed to locate the German ships in heavy weather.

==== Battle of Jutland ====
At the end of May 1916, the 3rd BCS was temporarily assigned to the Grand Fleet for gunnery practice. On 30 May, the entire Grand Fleet, along with Admiral Beatty's battlecruisers, was ordered to sea to prepare for an excursion by the German High Seas Fleet. In order to support Beatty, Admiral Hood took his three battlecruisers ahead of the Grand Fleet. At about 14:30 Invincible intercepted a radio message from the British light cruiser Galatea, attached to Beatty's Battlecruiser Force, reporting the sighting of two enemy cruisers. This was amplified by other reports of seven enemy ships steering north. Hood interpreted this as an attempt to escape through the Skagerrak and ordered an increase in speed to 22 knots (41 km/h; 25 mph) at 15:11 and steered East-Southeast to cut off the fleeing ships. Twenty minutes later Invincible intercepted a message from Beatty reporting five enemy battlecruisers in sight and later signals reporting that he was engaging the enemy on a south-easterly course. At 16:06 Hood ordered full speed and a course of south-southeast in an attempt to converge on Beatty. At 16:56, with no British ships in sight, Hood requested Beatty's course, position and speed, but never received a reply.

Hood continued on course until 17:40 when gunfire was spotted in the direction to which his light cruiser Chester had been dispatched to investigate other gunfire flashes. Chester encountered four light cruisers of Hipper's 2nd Scouting Group and was badly damaged before Hood turned to investigate and was able to drive the German cruisers away from Chester. At 17:53 Invincible opened fire on Wiesbaden and the other two Invincibles followed two minutes later. The German ships turned for the south after fruitlessly firing torpedoes at 18:00 and attempted to find shelter in the mist. As they turned Invincible hit Wiesbaden in the engine room and knocked out her engines while Inflexible hit Pillau once. The 2nd Scouting Group was escorted by the light cruiser Regensburg and 31 destroyers of the 2nd and 9th Flotillas and the 12th Half-Flotilla which attacked the 3rd BCS in succession. They were driven off by Hood's remaining light cruiser Canterbury and the five destroyers of his escort. In a confused action the Germans only launched 12 torpedoes and disabled the destroyer Shark with gunfire. Having turned due west to close on Beatty's ships, the Invincibles were broadside to the oncoming torpedoes, but Invincible turned north, while Inflexible and Indomitable turned south to present their narrowest profile to the torpedoes. All the torpedoes missed, although one passed underneath Inflexible without detonating. As Invincible turned north, her helm jammed and she had to come to a stop to fix the problem, but this was quickly done and the squadron reformed heading west.

At 18:21, with both Beatty and the Grand Fleet converging on him, Hood turned south to lead Beatty's battlecruisers. Hipper's battlecruisers were 9,000 yards (8,200 m) away and the Invincibles almost immediately opened fire on Hipper's flagship Lützow and Derfflinger. Indomitable hit Derfflinger three times and Seydlitz once, while the Lützow quickly took 10 hits from Lion, Inflexible and Invincible, including two hits below the waterline forward by Invincible that would ultimately doom Hipper's flagship. But at 18:30, Invincible abruptly appeared as a clear target before Lützow and Derfflinger. The two German ships then fired three salvoes each at Invincible, and sank her in 90 seconds. A 305 mm (12-inch) shell from the third salvo struck the roof of Invincible's midships 'Q' turret, flash detonated the magazines below, and the ship blew up and broke in two, killing all but 6 of her crew of 1,032 officers and men, including Rear-Admiral Hood.

Inflexible and Indomitable remained in company with Beatty for the rest of the battle. They encountered Hipper's battlecruisers only 10,000 yards (9,100 m) away as the sun was setting about 20:19 and opened fire. Seydlitz was hit five times before the German battlecruisers were rescued by the appearance of the pre-dreadnought battleships of Rear Admiral Mauve and the British shifted fire to the new threat. Three of the predreadnoughts were hit before they too were able to turn into the gloom.

==== Later career ====
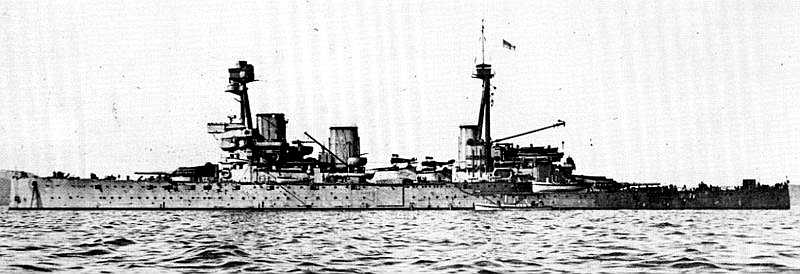
Indomitable in 1918. Note the aircraft carried on the midships turrets.

The loss of three battlecruisers at Jutland (the others were Queen Mary and Indefatigable) led to the force being reorganised into two squadrons, with Inflexible and Indomitable in the 2nd BCS. However, after Jutland there was little significant naval activity for the Invincibles, other than routine patrolling, thanks to the Kaiser's order that his ships should not be allowed to go to sea unless assured of victory. She was refitted in August 1916, where she received additional armour over her magazine and turret roofs. Indomitable was fitted with two flying off ramps fitted above her midships turrets in early 1918.

The end of the war saw the end for many of the older vessels, not least the two remaining Invincibles. Both were sent to the Reserve Fleet in 1919, and were paid off in March 1920, before being sold for scrap on 1 December 1921.

== Bibliography ==
- Burt, R. A. (1986). British Battleships of World War One. Annapolis, Maryland: Naval Institute Press. ISBN 0-87021-863-8.
- Campbell, John (1986). Jutland: An Analysis of the Fighting. Annapolis, Maryland: Naval Institute Press. ISBN 0-87021-324-5.
- Carlyon, Les (2001). Gallipoli. London: Transworld Publishers. ISBN 0-385-60475-0.
- Johnston, Ian & Buxton, Ian (2013). The Battleship Builders – Constructing and Arming British Capital Ships. Annapolis, Maryland: Naval Institute Press. ISBN 978-1-59114-027-6.
- Massie, Robert (2004). Castles of Steel: Britain, Germany and the Winning of the Great War. New York: Random House. ISBN 0-224-04092-8.
- Osborne, Eric W. (2004). Cruisers and Battle Cruisers: An Illustrated History of Their Impact. ABC-CLIO. ISBN 1-85109-369-9.
- Parkes, Oscar (1990) [1966]. British Battleships, Warrior 1860 to Vanguard 1950: A History of Design, Construction, and Armament (New & rev. ed.). Annapolis, Maryland: Naval Institute Press. ISBN 1-55750-075-4.
- Preston, Antony (1985). "Great Britain and Empire Forces". In Gray, Randal (ed.). Conway's All the World's Fighting Ships 1906–1921. Annapolis, Maryland: Naval Institute Press. pp. 1–104. ISBN 0-85177-245-5.
- Roberts, John (1997). Battlecruisers. Annapolis, Maryland: Naval Institute Press. ISBN 1-55750-068-1.
- Tarrant, V. E. (1986). Battlecruiser Invincible: The History of the First Battlecruiser, 1909–16. Annapolis, Maryland: Naval Institute Press. ISBN 0-87021-147-1.
