= Invincible-class battlecruiser =

Royal Navy ships

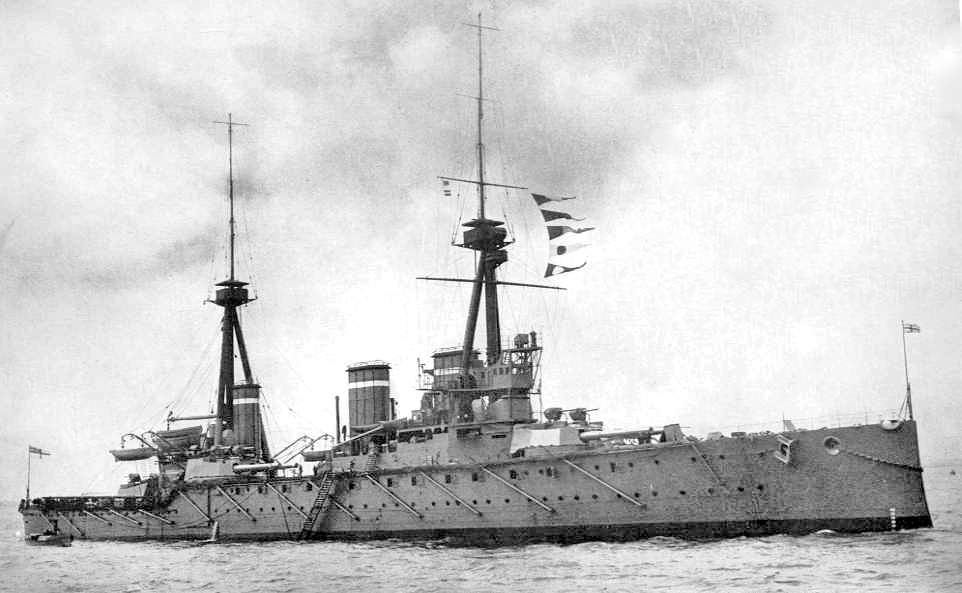
- An early photograph of Invincible, before her torpedo nets were removed

Class overview
- Name: Invincible-class battlecruiser
- Builders: Armstrong Whitworth; Fairfield Shipbuilding & Eng.; John Brown & Co.
- Operators: Royal Navy
- Preceded by: None
- Succeeded by: Indefatigable class
- Cost: £1.7 m
- Built: 1906–1909
- In service: 1908–1921
- Completed: 3
- Lost: 1
- Scrapped: 2

General characteristics
- Type: Battlecruiser
- Displacement: 17,250 long tons (17,530 t) (normal); 20,420 long tons (20,750 t) (deep load)
- Length: 567 ft (172.8 m) (o/a)
- Beam: 78 ft 6 in (23.9 m)
- Draught: 30 ft (9.1 m) (deep load)
- Installed power: 31 water-tube boilers; 41,000 shp (31,000 kW)
- Propulsion: 4 shafts; 2 direct-drive steam turbine sets
- Speed: 25 knots (46 km/h; 29 mph)
- Range: 3,090 nmi (5,720 km) at 10 knots (19 km/h; 12 mph)
- Complement: 784
- Armament: 4 × twin 12 in (305 mm) guns; 16 × single 4 in (102 mm) guns; 5 × single 18 in (450 mm) torpedo tubes
- Armour: Belt: 4–6 in (102–152 mm); Decks: 1.5–2.5 in (38–64 mm); Barbettes: 7 in (178 mm); Turrets: 7 in (178 mm); Conning tower: 6–10 in (152–254 mm); Torpedo bulkheads: 2.5 in (64 mm)

The three Invincible-class battlecruisers were built for the Royal Navy and entered service in 1908 as the world's first battlecruisers. They were the brainchild of Admiral Sir John ("Jacky") Fisher, the man who had sponsored the construction of the world's first "all-big-gun" warship, HMS Dreadnought. He visualised a new breed of warship, somewhere between the armoured cruiser and battleship; it would have the armament of the latter, but the high speed of the former. This combination would allow it to chase down most ships, while allowing it to run from more powerful designs.

This design philosophy would prove to be most successful when the Invincibles were able to use their speed to run down smaller and weaker ships. The classic example was during World War I at the Battle of the Falkland Islands, where Invincible and Inflexible sank the German armoured cruisers SMS Scharnhorst and SMS Gneisenau; despite numerous hits by the German ships, Inflexible and Invincible incurred very few casualties among their crews. They were least successful when standing in the main line of battle, where they faced enemy capital ships. An example is the loss of Invincible to a magazine explosion during the Battle of Jutland about eighteen months after her success in the Falklands, although this explosion owed more to flaws in British ammunition-handling practices – that exposed numerous cordite charges to a fire in one of her gun turrets – than any flaws in the design of the ship.

After the loss of Invincible, the two surviving ships had an uneventful time for the rest of the war conducting patrols of the North Sea, as the High Seas Fleet was forbidden to risk any more losses. They were put into reserve in early 1919 and sold for scrap in 1921.

== Design ==
After Admiral Fisher was appointed First Sea Lord on 20 October 1904, he pushed through the Board of Admiralty in early December 1904 a decision to arm the next armoured cruiser with 12-inch (305 mm) guns and that it would have a speed no less than 25.5 knots (47.2 km/h; 29.3 mph). Shortly afterwards he convened a "Committee on Designs" to investigate and report on requirements for future ships. While nominally independent, it served to validate decisions already made and to deflect criticism off Fisher and the Board of Admiralty, as it had no ability to consider options other than those already decided upon by the Admiralty. Fisher appointed all of the members of the committee and himself as President of the committee. During its last meeting on the 22 of February 1905 it decided on the outline design of the fast armoured cruiser. This, in turn, was approved by the Board on March the 16th with only minor changes, such as the reduction in the anti-torpedo boat armament from twenty to eighteen 12-pdr guns.

=== General characteristics ===
The Invincible-class ships were formally known as armoured cruisers until 1911, when they were redesignated as battlecruisers by an Admiralty order of 24 November. Unofficially a number of designations were used until then, including cruiser-battleship, dreadnought cruiser and battle-cruiser.

The Invincibles were significantly larger than their armoured cruiser predecessors of the Minotaur class. They had an overall length of 567 ft (173 m), a beam of 78.5 ft (23.9 m), and a draught of 30 ft (9.1 m) at deep load. They displaced 17,250 long tons (17,530 t) at load and 20,420 long tons (20,750 t) at deep load, nearly 3,000 long tons (3,050 t) more than the earlier ships.

=== Propulsion ===
Early in the design process the "Committee on Designs" had thought to power these ships with the traditional reciprocating vertical triple-expansion steam engines, but were persuaded to adopt Parsons steam turbines as they required fewer boilers for the same amount of power, were easier to protect from damage as they were more compact than reciprocating engines and could be kept below the waterline. In addition they were significantly lighter and more reliable than the older design. The direct-drive turbines then in use did have one significant drawback in that they ran at a relatively high speed which required small-diameter, fine-pitch propellers of a large blade area which adversely affected manoeuvrability at low speeds. Parsons alleviated this problem by his suggestion of fitting more powerful astern turbines on all four shafts, which could increase manoeuvrability by reversing the turbines as needed.

An additional solution was to fit twin balanced rudders behind each inner shaft, in contrast to the single central rudder used on earlier ships. This greatly increased the effectiveness of the rudder and substantially decreased the turning circle of the Invincibles in comparison to earlier ships of their size.

The Invincibles had two paired sets of Parsons turbines housed in separate engine-rooms. Each set consisted of a high-pressure ahead and astern turbine driving an outboard shaft, and a low-pressure ahead and astern turbine driving an inner shaft. A cruising turbine was also coupled to each inner shaft, although these were not used often and were eventually disconnected. Each shaft drove a propeller 11 feet (3.4 m) in diameter. The turbines were designed to produce a total of 41,000 shaft horsepower (31,000 kW), but reached nearly 47,000 shp (35,000 kW) during trials in 1908. Designed speed was 25 knots (46.3 km/h; 28.8 mph), but all three bettered 26 knots (48.2 km/h; 29.9 mph) during trials. Indomitable maintained an average speed of 25.3 knots (46.9 km/h; 29.1 mph) for three days during a passage of the North Atlantic in August 1908.

The steam plant consisted of 31 Yarrow (Invincible and Inflexible) or Babcock & Wilcox (Indomitable) large-tube boilers, arranged in four boiler rooms. Maximum bunkerage was approximately 3,000 long tons (3,050 t) of coal, with an additional 725 long tons (737 t) of fuel oil to be sprayed on the coal to increase its burn rate. At full fuel capacity, the ships could steam for 3,090 nautical miles (5,720 km; 3,560 mi) at a speed of 10 knots (19 km/h; 12 mph).

=== Armament ===
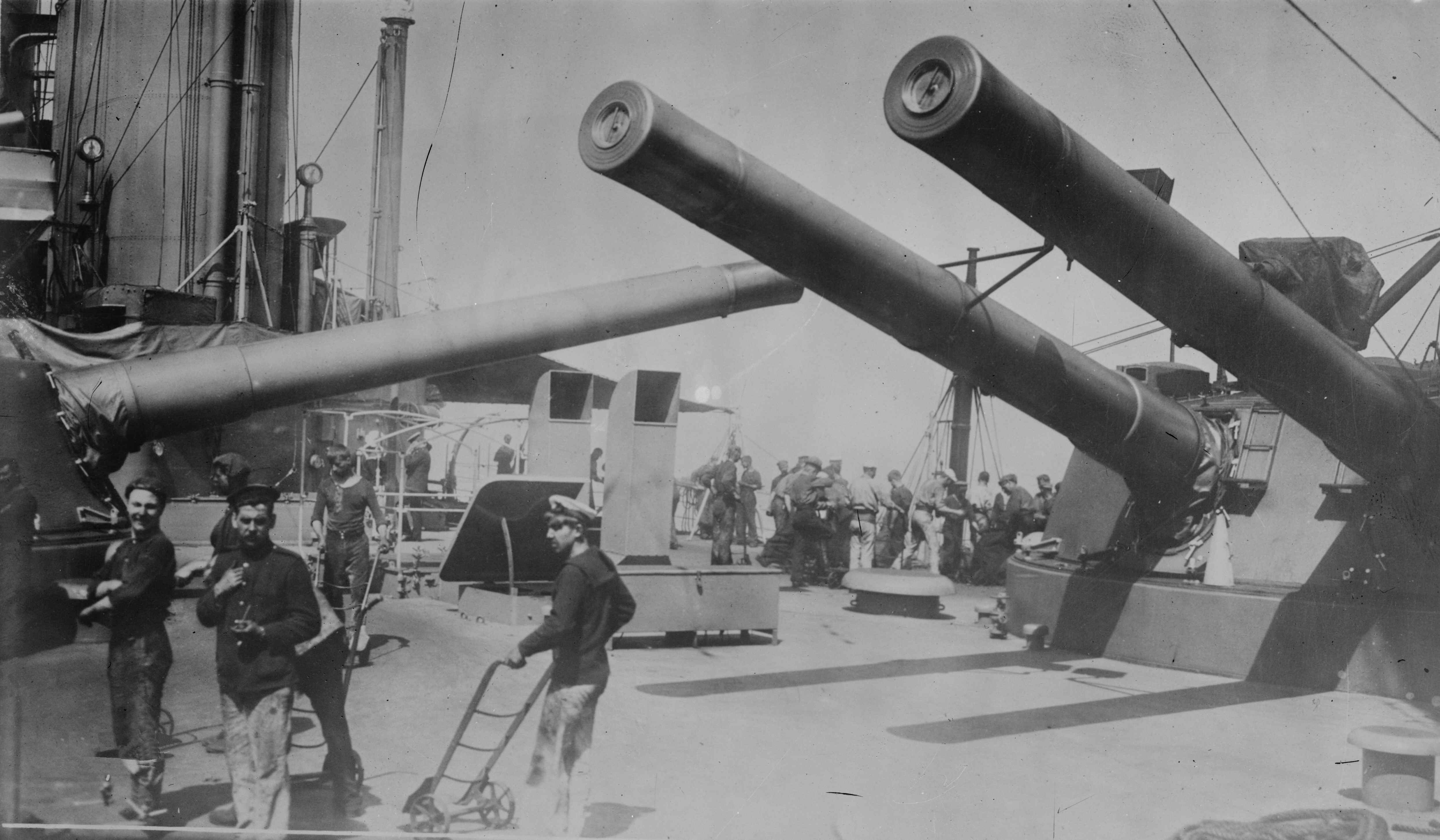
The guns of 'P' and 'Q' turrets trained across the deck

Each carried eight BL 12-inch (305 mm) Mk X guns in four hydraulically powered BVIII twin-gun turrets, except for Invincible which mounted her guns in two BIX and two BX electrically driven turrets. Two turrets were mounted fore and aft of the superstructure on the centreline, identified as 'A' and 'X' respectively. Two turrets were mounted amidships between the second and third funnels, identified as 'P' and 'Q'. 'P' turret was mounted on the port side and normally faced forward, 'Q' turret was mounted on the starboard side and normally faced aft (rearwards). 'P' and 'Q' turrets were staggered—'P' was forward of 'Q', enabling 'P' to fire in a limited arc to the starboard side and 'Q' to likewise fire in a limited arc towards the port side. These were the same guns as those mounted in HMS Dreadnought, the Lord Nelson class and the Bellerophon class, and for a brief period the Invincibles equalled the firepower of any other nations' battleships.

The guns could initially be depressed to −3° and elevated to 13.5°, although the turrets were modified to allow 16° of elevation during World War I. They fired 850-pound (390 kg) projectiles at a muzzle velocity of 2,746 ft/s (837 m/s); at 13.5°, this provided a maximum range of 20,435 yd (18,686 m) using 4crh shells. The rate of fire of these guns was about two rounds per minute. The ships had a total of 880 rounds during wartime for 110 shells per gun.

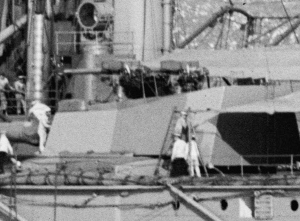
4-inch guns seen mounted on roof of Inflexible's Q turret, 1909

The ships' secondary armament initially was intended to consist of eighteen quick-firing (QF) 12-pounder (3 in (76 mm)) guns, but firing trials against the old destroyer Skate in 1906 showed that the 12-pounder gun had little chance of stopping a destroyer or torpedo boat before it got close enough to fire its torpedoes. They were replaced by sixteen 4-inch (102 mm) QF Mk I and III guns early in the construction process. They were positioned in the superstructure and on turret roofs in open mounts as they were not expected to be manned in a ship-to-ship engagement during daylight. During 1914–1915 the turret-roof guns were transferred to the superstructure and the total number of guns was reduced to twelve. All of the remaining guns were enclosed in casemates and given gun shields at that time to better protect the gun crews from weather and enemy action. The guns on their PI* mounts had a maximum depression of 10° and a maximum elevation of 20°. They fired 31-pound (14 kg) projectiles at a muzzle velocity of 2,335–2,370 ft/s (712–722 m/s); at 20°, this provided a maximum range of 9,600 yd (8,800 m) using Common pointed shells.

These guns were replaced by twelve 4-inch BL MK IX guns on CPI mountings on Inflexible during 1917. They could depress 10° and elevate to 30°. They fired 31-pound shells at a muzzle velocity of 2,642 ft/s (805 m/s). The QF Mk III guns were replaced by twelve 4-inch BL MK VII guns on PVI mountings on Indomitable during 1917. These guns could depress 7° and elevate to 15°. They fired 31-pound shells at a muzzle velocity of 2,821 ft/s (860 m/s) which gave a maximum range of 11,400 yd (10,400 m). Their rate of fire was 6–8 rounds per minute. An additional gun was fitted on Indomitable in April 1917 as an anti-aircraft (AA) gun. It was mounted on a MK II high-angle mounting with a maximum elevation of 60°. It had a reduced propellant charge with a muzzle velocity of only 2,400 ft/s (730 m/s).

Earlier anti-aircraft guns included a QF three-pounder (1.9-inch (47 mm)) Hotchkiss gun on a high-angle Mk Ic mounting with a maximum elevation of 60°. Both Invincible and Indomitable carried theirs from November 1914 to August 1917. It fired 3.3-pound (1.5 kg) projectiles at a muzzle velocity of 1,927 ft/s (587 m/s). Each of the Invincibles was also fitted with a single QF 3-inch 20 cwt AA gun on a high-angle MKII mount at the aft end of the superstructure. It fired a 12.5-pound (5.7 kg) shell at a muzzle velocity of 2,604 ft/s (794 m/s). Five 18-inch (450 mm) submerged torpedo tubes were mounted on the Invincibles, two on each side and one in the stern and fourteen torpedoes were carried.

=== Fire control ===
The spotting tops at the head of the fore and main masts controlled the fire of the Invincibles' main guns. Data from a 9-foot (2.7 m) rangefinder from Barr and Stroud was input into a Dumaresq mechanical computer and electrically transmitted to Vickers range clocks located in the Transmitting Station located beneath each spotting top where it was converted into range and deflection data for use by the guns. The target's data was also graphically recorded on a plotting table to assist the gunnery officer in predicting the movement of the target. Each gun turret had its own transmission equipment and the turrets, Transmitting Stations, and spotting tops could be connected in almost any combination. Firing trials against Hero in 1907 revealed this system's vulnerability to gunfire as the spotting top was hit twice and a large splinter severed the voice pipe and all wiring running along the mast. To guard against this possibility, 'A' turret was fitted, during refits between 1911 and 1914, with a 9-foot rangefinder at the rear of the turret roof and it was equipped to control the entire main armament.

Fire control technology advanced quickly during the years immediately preceding World War I and the development of the Dreyer Fire Control Table was one such advance. It combined the functions of the Dumaresq and the range clock and a simplified version, the Mk I, was fitted to the Invincibles during refits in 1915–16. The more important development was the director firing system. This consisted of a fire control director mounted high in the ship which electrically provided gun data to the turrets via pointers, which the turret crewmen only had to follow. The director officer fired the guns simultaneously, which aided in spotting the shell splashes and minimised the effects of the roll on the dispersion of the shells. Invincible was the first battlecruiser to receive this system during her refit from April to August 1914, but its installation was interrupted by the outbreak of the war and it was not fully working until after the Battle of the Falkland Islands in November. Indomitable and Inflexible didn't receive their systems until May 1916, immediately before the Battle of Jutland.

=== Protection ===
The armour protection given to the Invincibles the waterline belt measured 6 inches (152 mm) amidships was only slightly more than half the thickness of Dreadnought's 11 inches (279 mm). The belt was six inches thick roughly between the fore and aft twelve-inch gun turrets, but was reduced to four inches from the fore turret to the bow and did not extend aft of the rear turret. A six-inch bulkhead met the barbette of X turret to fully enclose the armoured citadel. The gun turrets and barbettes were protected by 7 in (178 mm) of armour, except for the turret roofs which used 3 in (76 mm) of Krupp non-cemented armour (KNC). The thickness of the main deck was 1 in (25 mm) around the base of barbettes and the crown of the base of the rear conning tower. It was 2 in (51 mm) over the crown of the base of the forward conning tower. The lower deck armour was 1.5 in (38 mm) on the flat and two inches thick on the slope, except aft of the rear turret where it was increased to 2.5 in (64 mm) to protect the steering gear. The front and sides of the forward conning tower were 10 in (254 mm) thick while its rear was 7 in (178 mm). The walls of the rear conning tower were six inches thick. The roof and floor of both conning towers were KNC armour 2 inches thick while their communication tubes were 3 in (76 mm) of KNC. The signal tower immediately aft of the forward conning tower also had three inches of KNC. Torpedo bulkheads of 2.5-inch thick mild steel were fitted abreast the magazines and shell rooms. Krupp cemented armour was used throughout, unless otherwise mentioned.

=== Aircraft ===
By 1918 the two surviving Invincibles carried a Sopwith Pup and a Sopwith 1½ Strutter on flying-off ramps fitted on top of 'P' and 'Q' turrets. Each platform had a canvas hangar to protect the aircraft during inclement weather.

== Ships ==
The three Invincibles were ordered at the same time as Dreadnought as part of the 1905–06 Naval Programme. The following table gives the build details and purchase cost of the members of the Invincible class. Whilst standard British practice at that time was for these costs to exclude armament and stores, for some reason the cost quoted in The Naval Annual for this class includes armament.

Construction data
Ship	Builder	Laid down	Launched	Commissioned	Cost according to	
Ship	Builder	Laid down	Launched	Commissioned	BNA 1914 (estimated cost, including guns)	Parkes
Invincible	Armstrong Whitworth, Elswick	2 April 1906	13 April 1907	20 March 1909	£1,768,995	£1,635,739 armament £90,000
Inflexible	John Brown & Co., Clydebank	5 February 1906	26 June 1907	20 October 1908	£1,728,229	£1,677,515 armament £90,000
Indomitable	Fairfield, Govan	1 March 1906	16 March 1907	25 June 1908	£1,761,080	£1,662,337 armament £90,000

== Service history ==
All three ships entered service from the second half of 1908. Initially, Invincible and Inflexible were assigned to the Home Fleet, while Indomitable took the Prince of Wales (later King George V) to the tercentennial celebrations in Canada, before also joining the Home Fleet. Invincible's electrically driven turrets proved to be a failure despite two lengthy refits in 1909 and 1911 and were converted to hydraulic power during her refit in early 1914 at the enormous cost of £151,200. The situation was so bad during her gunnery trials in October 1908 that the captain of HMS Excellent, the Royal Navy's gunnery school described their operation thusly: "When the order was given to train the turret, elevate or run a gun in or out, it was only necessary to push a button, or move a switch, but the result was often a flash of blue flame which seemed to fill the turret."

In 1914, Invincible was refitting in England, while Inflexible and Indomitable, together with the newer Indefatigable formed the nucleus of the Mediterranean Fleet, where Inflexible served as flagship from November 1912. It was in the Mediterranean that the first naval action of the First World War took place, when the British pursued the German warships Goeben and Breslau upon the outbreak of war.

=== World War I ===
==== Pursuit of Goeben and Breslau ====
Indomitable, accompanied by Indefatigable, under the command of Admiral Sir Archibald Berkeley Milne encountered the battlecruiser Goeben and the light cruiser Breslau on the morning of 4 August 1914 headed east after a cursory bombardment of the French Algerian port of Philippeville, but Britain and Germany were not yet at war so Milne turned to shadow the Germans as they headed back to Messina to recoal. All three battlecruisers had problems with their boilers, but Goeben and Breslau were able to break contact and reached Messina by the morning of the 5th. By this time war had been declared, after the German invasion of Belgium, but an Admiralty order to respect Italian neutrality and stay outside a six-mile (10 km) limit from the Italian coast precluded entrance into the passage of the Strait of Messina where they could observe the port directly. Therefore, Milne stationed Inflexible and Indefatigable at the northern exit of the Straits of Messina, still expecting the Germans to break out to the west where they could attack French troop transports, the light cruiser Gloucester at the southern exit and sent Indomitable to recoal at Bizerte where she was better positioned to react to a German sortie into the Western Mediterranean.

The Germans sortied from Messina on 6 August and headed east, towards Constantinople, trailed by Gloucester. Milne, still expecting Rear Admiral Wilhelm Souchon to turn west, kept the battlecruisers at Malta until shortly after midnight on 8 August when he set sail for Cape Matapan at a leisurely 12 knots (22 km/h; 14 mph), where Goeben had been spotted eight hours earlier. At 2:30 p.m. he received an incorrect signal from the Admiralty stating that Britain was at war with Austria – war would not be declared until 12 August and the order was countermanded four hours later, but Milne followed his standing orders to guard the Adriatic against an Austrian break-out attempt, rather than seek Goeben. Finally on 9 August Milne was given clear orders to "chase Goeben which had passed Cape Matapan on the 7th steering north-east." Milne still did not believe that Souchon was heading for the Dardanelles, and so he resolved to guard the exit from the Aegean, unaware that the Goeben did not intend to come out. Indomitable remained in the Mediterranean to blockade the Dardanelles, but Inflexible was ordered home on 18 August.

On 3 November 1914, Churchill ordered the first British attack on the Dardanelles following the opening of hostilities between Turkey and Russia. The attack was carried out by Indomitable and Indefatigable, as well as the French pre-dreadnought battleships Suffren and Vérité. The intention of the attack was to test the fortifications and measure the Turkish response. The results were deceptively encouraging. In a twenty-minute bombardment, a single shell struck the magazine of the fort at Sedd el Bahr at the tip of the Gallipoli peninsula, displacing (but not destroying) 10 guns and killing 86 Turkish soldiers. The most significant consequence was that the attention of the Turks was drawn to strengthening their defences, and they set about expanding the mine field. This attack actually took place before a formal declaration of war had been made by Britain against the Ottoman Empire which happened on 6 November. Indomitable was ordered to return to England in December where she joined the 2nd Battlecruiser Squadron (BCS).

==== Battle of Heligoland Bight ====
Invincible's first action was as part of the battlecruiser force under the command of Admiral Beatty during the Battle of Heligoland Bight operation on 28 August 1914. Beatty's ships had originally been intended as distant support of the British cruisers and destroyers closer to the German coast in case large units of the High Seas Fleet sortied in response to the British attacks. They turned south at full speed at 11:35 (Note: The times used in this section are in UTC, which is one hour behind CET, which is often used in German works.) when the British light forces failed to disengage on schedule and the rising tide meant that German capital ships would be able to clear the bar at the mouth of the Jade estuary. The brand-new light cruiser Arethusa had been crippled earlier in the battle and was under fire from the light cruisers Strassburg and Cöln when Beatty's battlecruisers loomed out of the mist at 12:37. Strassburg was able to duck into the mists and evade fire, but Cöln remained visible and was quickly crippled by fire from the squadron. But Beatty was distracted from the task of finishing her off by the sudden appearance of the elderly light cruiser Ariadne directly to his front. He turned in pursuit, but reduced her to a flaming hulk in only three salvos at a range under 6,000 yards (5,500 m). At 13:10 Beatty turned north and made a general signal to retire. At this time, Invincible, trailing the main body of battlecruisers, opened fire on Cöln. She fired 18 rounds, all misses, before Beatty's main body encountered the crippled Cöln shortly after turning north and she was sunk by two salvos from Lion.

=== Battle of the Falklands ===
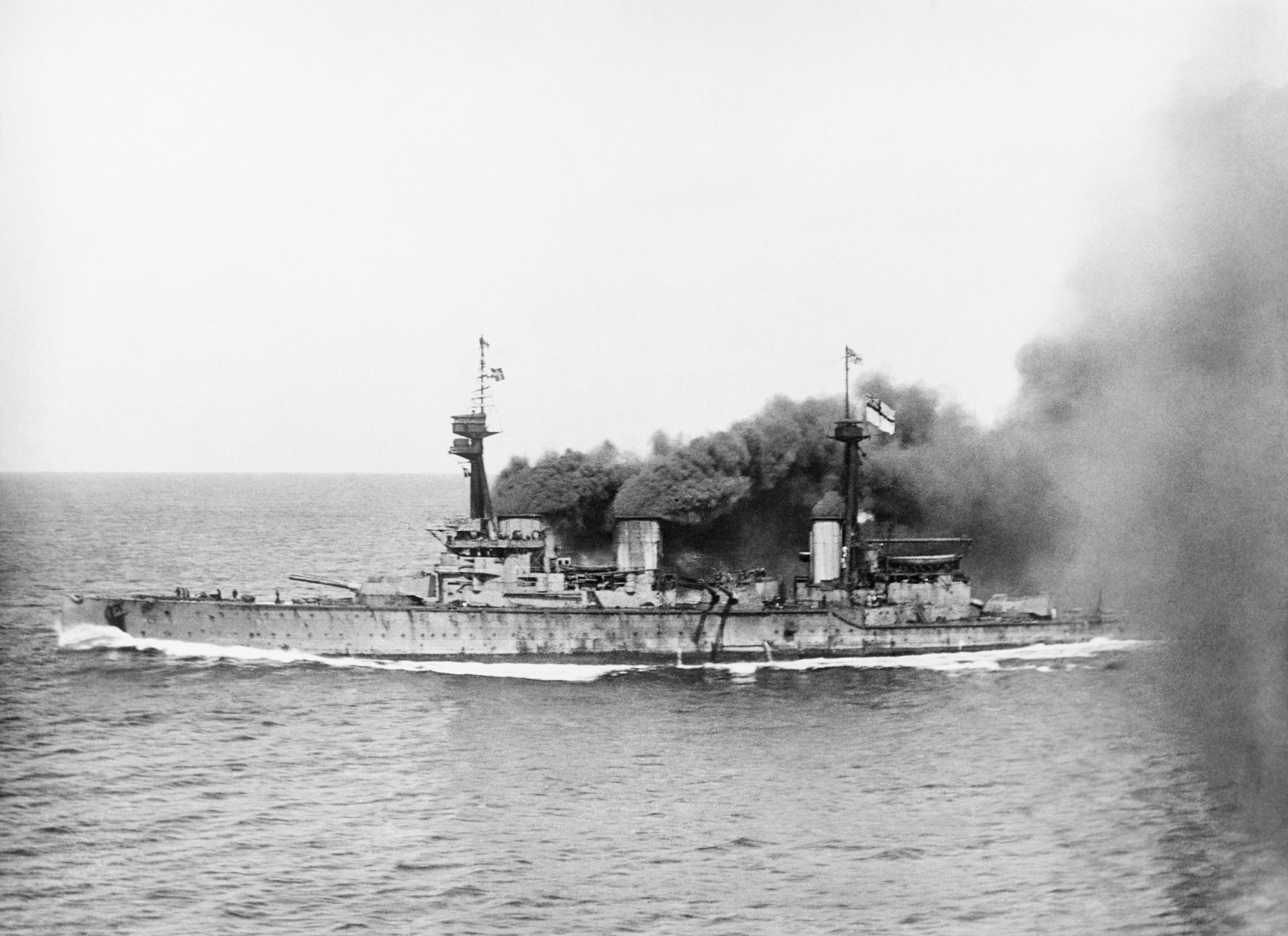
Invincible during the pursuit of the German cruiser squadron

The West Indies Squadron of Rear Admiral Christopher Cradock was destroyed by the German East Asia Squadron commanded by Admiral Graf von Spee during the Battle of Coronel on 1 November 1914. In response, the Admiralty ordered that a squadron be sent to destroy the Germans. The squadron, under the command of Admiral Sir Doveton Sturdee, consisted of Invincible (flag) and Inflexible. They departed on 11 November and rendezvoused with several other cruisers under Rear Admiral Stoddard at Abrolhos Rocks off the coast of Brazil on the 26th. The combined force departed the following day and reached Port Stanley on the morning of 7 December.

Spee, making a leisurely voyage back to the Atlantic, decided to destroy the radio station at Port Stanley and sent the armoured cruiser SMS Gneisenau and the light cruiser Nürnberg on the morning of 8 December to see if the harbour was clear of British warships. They were spotted at 07:30 although the pre-dreadnought Canopus, grounded in Stanley Harbour to defend the town and its wireless station, did not receive the signal until 07:45. It mattered little because Sturdee was not expecting an engagement and most of his ships were coaling. Furthermore, the armoured cruiser Cornwall and the light cruiser Bristol had one or both of their engines under repair. The armed merchant cruiser Macedonian was patrolling the outer harbour entrance while the armoured cruiser Kent was anchored in the outer harbour, scheduled to relieve the Macedonian at 08:00. The Germans were not expecting any resistance and the first salvo from Canopus's guns at 09:20 caused them to sheer off from their planned bombardment of the wireless station and fall back on Spee's main body.

Sturdee's ships did not sortie from the harbour until 9:50, but they could see the retreating German ships on the southwest horizon. The Invincibles, fresh out of dry dock, had a 5 knots (9.3 km/h; 5.8 mph) advantage over Spee's ships which all had fouled bottoms that limited their speeds to 20 knots (37 km/h; 23 mph) at best. The light cruiser SMS Leipzig was lagging behind the other ships and Inflexible opened fire on her when the range dropped to 17,500 yards (16.0 km) at 12:55. Invincible opened fire shortly afterwards and both ships began straddling Leipzig as the range closed to 13,000 yards (12,000 m). At 01:20 Spee ordered his squadron to separate and ordered his light cruisers to turn to the southwest while his armoured cruisers turned to the north east to cover their retreat. The German ships opened fire first at 13:30 and scored their first hit at 13:44 when SMS Scharnhorst hit Invincible, although the shell burst harmlessly on the belt armour. Both sides fired rapidly during the first half-hour of the engagement before Sturdee opened up the range a little to put his ships outside the effective range of the German guns. British gunnery was very poor during this period, scoring only four hits out of 210 rounds fired. The primary cause was the smoke from the guns and funnels as the British were downwind of the Germans, although one gun of Invincible's 'A' turret jammed at 13:42 and was out of action for thirty minutes.

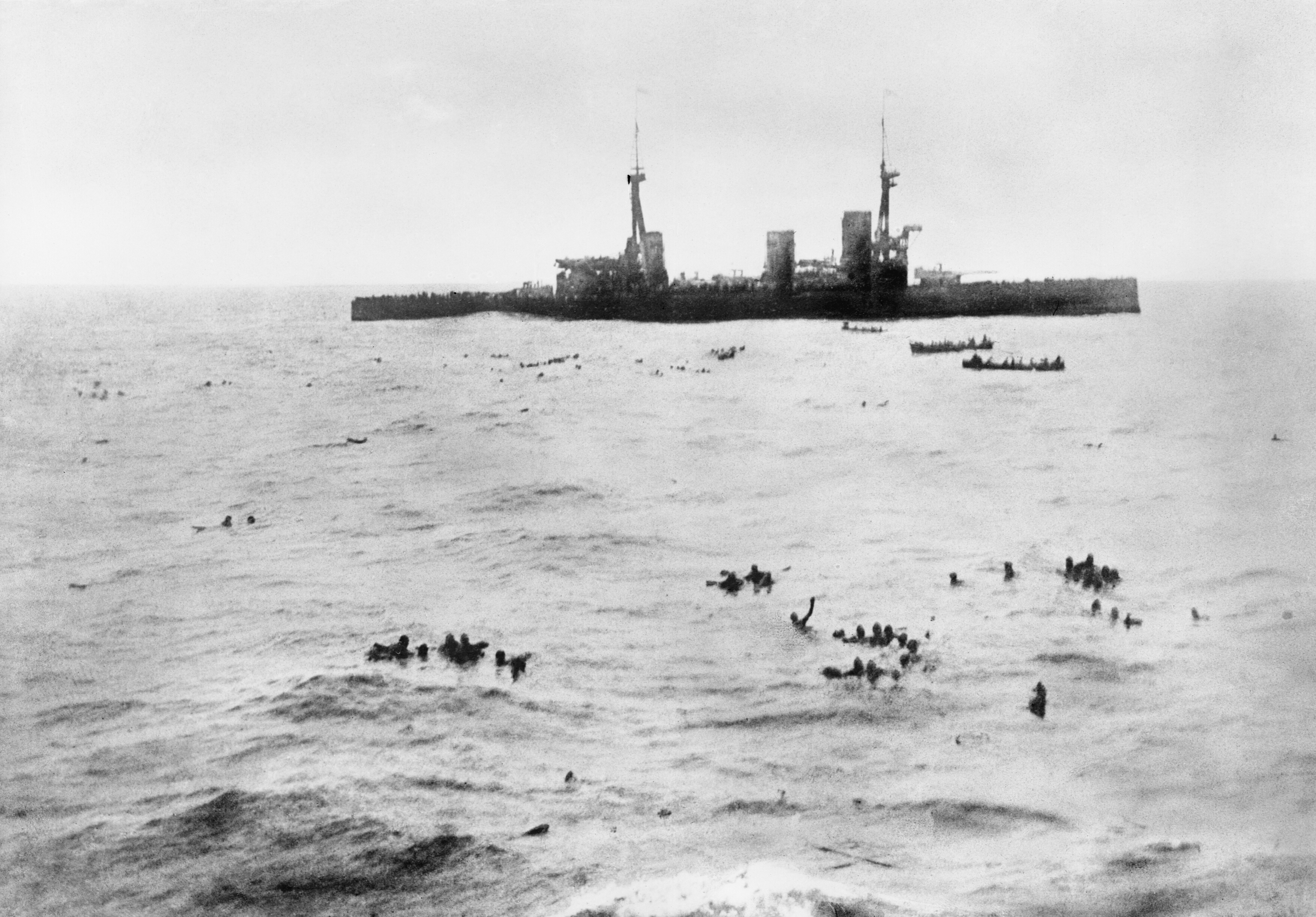
Inflexible picking up survivors from SMS Gneisenau

Spee turned to the south in the hope of disengaging while the British had their vision obscured, but only opened the range to 17,000 yards (16,000 m) before the British saw his course change. This was futile as the British battlecruisers gave chase at 24 knots (44 km/h; 28 mph). Forty minutes later the British opened fire again at 15,000 yards (14,000 m). Eight minutes later Spee turned again to the east to give battle. This time his strategy was to close the range on the British ships so he could bring his 15 cm (5.9 in) secondary armament into play. In this he was successful and the 15 cm guns were able to open fire at 15:00 at maximum elevation. On this course the smoke bothered both sides, but multiple hits were made regardless. Those made by the Germans either failed to detonate or hit in some insignificant area. On the contrary Gneisenau had her starboard engine room put out of action. Sturdee ordered his ships at 15:15 back across their own wakes to gain the windward advantage. Spee turned to the northwest, as if to attempt to cross the British T, but actually to bring Scharnhorst's undamaged starboard guns to bear as most of those on his port side were out of action. The British continued to hit Scharnhorst and Gneisenau regularly during this time and Scharnhorst ceased fire at 4:00 before capsizing at 16:17 with no survivors. Gneisenau had been slowed by earlier damage and was battered for another hour and a half by Inflexible and Invincible at ranges down to 4,000 yards (3,700 m). Despite the damage her crew continued to fire back until she ceased firing at 16:47. Sturdee was ready to order 'Cease fire' at 17:15 when an ammunition hoist was freed up and she made her last shot. The British continued to pound her until 17:50, after her captain had given the order to scuttle her at 17:40. She slowly capsized at 18:00 and the British were able to rescue 176 men. Invincible and Inflexible fired 513 and 661 twelve-inch shells respectively during the battle, but Inflexible had been hit only three times and Invincible had been hit twenty-two times. Two of her bow compartments were flooded and one hit on her waterline abreast 'P' turret had flooded a coal bunker and temporarily given her a 15° list. Only one man was killed and five wounded aboard the battlecruisers during the battle.

==== Battle of Dogger Bank ====
On 23 January 1915, a force of German battlecruisers under the command of Admiral Franz von Hipper sortied to clear the Dogger Bank of any British fishing boats or small craft that might be there to collect intelligence on German movements. But the British were reading their coded messages and sailed to intercept them with a larger force of British battlecruisers under the command of Admiral Beatty, which included Indomitable. Contact was initiated at 07:20 on the 24th when the British light cruiser Arethusa spotted the German light cruiser SMS Kolberg. By 07:35 the Germans had spotted Beatty's force and Hipper ordered a turn to the south at 20 knots (37 km/h; 23 mph), believing that this would suffice if the ships that he saw to his northwest were British battleships and that he could always increase speed to Blücher's maximum speed of 23 knots (43 km/h; 26 mph) if they were British battlecruisers.

Beatty ordered his battlecruisers to make all practicable speed to catch the Germans before they could escape. Indomitable managed to exceed 26 knots and Beatty recognised her performance with a signal at 08:55 "Well done, Indomitable" Despite this achievement Indomitable was the slowest of Beatty's ships and gradually fell behind the newer and faster battlecruisers. By 10:48 Blücher had been heavily damaged by fire from all the other battlecruisers and her speed had dropped to 17 knots (31 km/h; 20 mph) and her steering gear had been jammed; Beatty ordered Indomitable to attack her. But due to a combination of a mistake by Beatty's flag lieutenant in signalling, and heavy damage to Beatty's flagship Lion which had knocked out her radio and caused enough smoke to obscure her signal halyards so that Beatty couldn't communicate with his ships, the rest of the battlecruisers turned away from Hipper's main body and engaged Blücher. Indomitable fired 134 shells at Blücher before she capsized and sank at 12:07. After the end of the battle Indomitable was ordered to tow Lion back to port as one of her engines had been knocked out, the other was failing and she'd been holed a number of times beneath the waterline. It took over a day and a half at speeds of 7–10 knots (13–19 km/h; 8.1–11.5 mph).

==== Dardanelles Campaign ====
After the Battle of the Falklands Invincible and Inflexible were repaired and refitted at Gibraltar. Invincible sailed to England and joined the 3rd Battlecruiser Squadron while Inflexible arrived at the Dardanelles on 24 January 1915 where she replaced Indefatigable as the flagship of the Mediterranean Fleet. She bombarded Turkish fortifications on 19 February, the start of the Battle of Gallipoli, to little effect, and again on 15 March, with the same results. She was part of the first line of British ships on 18 March as they attempted to suppress the Turkish guns so the minefields could be swept. She was moderately damaged by Turkish gunfire, but was seriously damaged by a mine, probably about 100 kg (220 lb) in size, that blew a large hole in her starboard bow and flooded the forward torpedo flat, drowning 39 men. She had to be beached at the island of Bozcaada (Tenedos) to prevent her sinking, as she'd taken in some 1,600 long tons (1,600 t) of water, but she was temporarily repaired with a cofferdam over the 30-by-26-foot (9.1 m × 7.9 m) hole. She sailed to Malta, escorted by the battleship Canopus and cruiser Talbot on 6 April. She nearly foundered when her cofferdam worked loose in heavy weather en route and had to be towed stern-first by Canopus for six hours while the cofferdam was repaired. She was under repair at Malta until early June before she sailed for home. She reached the UK on 19 June where she joined the 3rd BCS.

Towards the end of the year, the British battlecruiser force was organised into three squadrons, with the 3rd BCS consisting of the three Invincible-class ships under the command of Rear Admiral Horace Hood in Invincible. The 1st and 3rd BCS had sortied in response to the German bombardment of Yarmouth and Lowestoft on 24–25 April 1916, but failed to locate the German ships in heavy weather. During the return home, Invincible was rammed by the patrol yacht Goissa. Goissa's bow was embedded in Invincible's side which partially stoved-in. Invincible's speed was reduced to 12 knots (22 km/h; 14 mph) through flooding and she was forced to haul out of line and proceed independently to Rosyth for repairs which lasted until 22 May.

=== Battle of Jutland ===
At the end of May 1916, the 3rd Battlecruiser Squadron was temporarily assigned to the Grand Fleet for gunnery practice. On 30 May, the entire Grand Fleet, along with Admiral Beatty's battlecruisers, had been ordered to sea to prepare for an excursion by the German High Seas Fleet. To support Beatty, Rear Admiral Hood took his three battlecruisers ahead of the Grand Fleet. At about 14:30 Invincible intercepted a radio message from the British light cruiser Galatea, attached to Beatty's Battlecruiser Force, reporting the sighting of two enemy cruisers. This was amplified by other reports of seven enemy ships steering north. Hood interpreted this as an attempt to escape through the Skagerrak and ordered an increase in speed to 22 knots (41 km/h; 25 mph) at 15:11 and steered East-Southeast to cut off the fleeing ships. Twenty minutes later Invincible intercepted a message from Beatty reporting five enemy battlecruisers in sight and later signals reporting that he was engaging the enemy on a south-easterly course. At 16:06 Hood ordered full speed and a course of south-southeast in an attempt to converge on Beatty. At 16:56, with no British ships in sight, Hood requested Beatty's course, position and speed, but never received a reply.

Hood continued on course until 17:40 when gunfire was spotted in the direction to which his light cruiser Chester had been dispatched to investigate other gunfire flashes. Chester encountered four light cruisers of Hipper's 2nd Scouting Group and was badly damaged before Hood turned to investigate and was able to drive the German cruisers away from Chester. At 17:53 Invincible opened fire on Wiesbaden and the other two Invincibles followed two minutes later. The German ships turned for the south after fruitlessly firing torpedoes at 18:00 and attempted to find shelter in the mist. As they turned Invincible hit Wiesbaden in the engine room and knocked out her engines while Inflexible hit Pillau once. The 2nd Scouting Group was escorted by the light cruiser Regensburg and 31 destroyers of the 2nd and 9th Flotillas and the 12th Half-Flotilla which attacked the 3rd BCS in succession. They were driven off by Hood's remaining light cruiser Canterbury and the five destroyers of his escort. In a confused action the Germans only launched 12 torpedoes and disabled the destroyer Shark with gunfire. Having turned due west to close on Beatty's ships, the Invincibles were broadside to the oncoming torpedoes, but Invincible turned north, while Inflexible and Indomitable turned south to present their narrowest profile to the torpedoes. All the torpedoes missed although one passed underneath Inflexible without detonating. As Invincible turned north, her helm jammed and she had to come to a stop to fix the problem, but this was quickly done and the squadron reformed heading west.

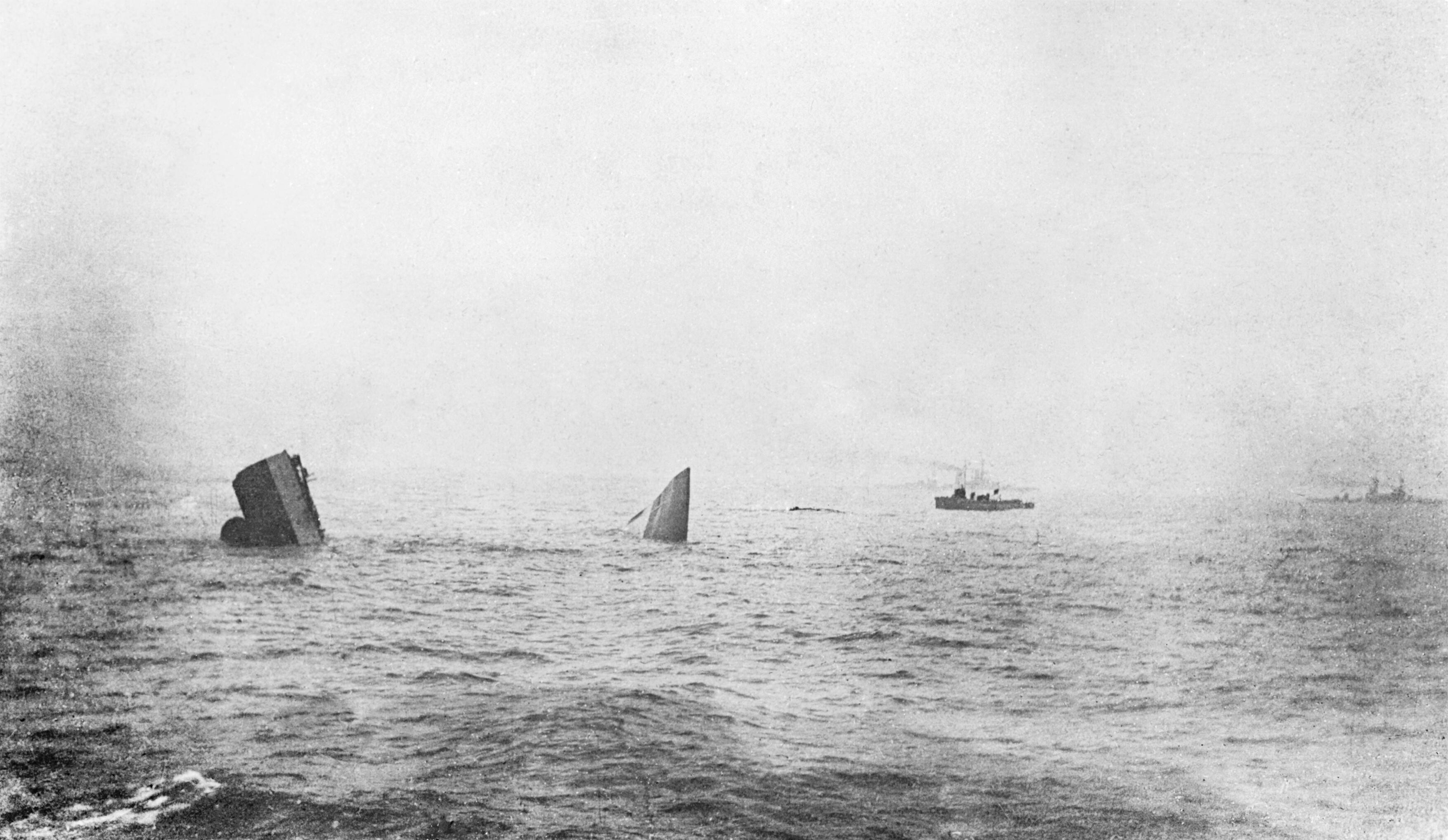
The wreck of Invincible prior to the ship finally sinking

At 18:21, with both Beatty and the Grand Fleet converging on him, Hood turned south to lead Beatty's battlecruisers. Hipper's battlecruisers were 9,000 yards (8,200 m) away and the Invincibles almost immediately opened fire on Hipper's flagship Lützow and Derfflinger. Indomitable hit Derfflinger three times and Seydlitz once, while the Lützow quickly took 10 hits from Lion, Inflexible and Invincible, including two hits below the waterline forward by Invincible that would ultimately doom her. But at 18:30 Invincible abruptly appeared as a clear target before Lützow and Derfflinger. The two German ships then fired three salvoes each at Invincible, and sank her in 90 seconds. A 305 mm (12-inch) shell from the third salvo struck Invincible's midships 'Q' turret, flash detonated the magazines below, and the ship blew up and broke in half, killing all but 6 of her crew of 1,032 officers and men, including Hood.

Inflexible and Indomitable remained in company with Beatty for the rest of the battle. They encountered Hipper's battlecruisers only 10,000 yards (9,100 m) away as the sun was setting about 20:19 and opened fire. Seydlitz was hit five times before the battlecruisers were rescued by the pre-dreadnought battleships of Rear Admiral Mauve and the British shifted fire to the new threat. Three of the predreadnoughts were hit before they too were able to turn into the gloom.

=== Post-Jutland career ===
The loss of three battlecruisers at Jutland (the others were Queen Mary and Indefatigable) led to the force being reorganised into two squadrons, with Inflexible and Indomitable in the 2nd BCS. However, after Jutland there was little significant naval activity, for the Invincibles, other than routine patrolling, thanks to the Kaiser's order that his ships should not be allowed to go to sea unless assured of victory. The end of the war saw the end for many of the older vessels, not least the two remaining Invincible-class ships. Both were sent to the Reserve Fleet in 1919, and were paid off in March 1920.

After the end of the war, Chile began seeking additional ships for its navy. In April 1920, Chile bought Canada and four destroyers, all of which had been ordered by Chile prior to the war's outbreak and requisitioned by the British for the war. Further planned expansion included Inflexible and Indomitable, but when the secret negotiations to acquire them were leaked to the press, a major uproar erupted in Chile. The most visible dissension came from a bloc of officers in the navy, who publicly opposed any possible purchase and instead promoted a "New Navy" which would acquire submarines and aircraft. They argued that these weapons would cost less and give the country, and its lengthy coastline, better protection from external threats. The ships were not bought for reasons of cost, but neither were the aircraft its supporters had been hoping for. Both were sold for scrap on 1 December 1921.

== Bibliography ==
- Brown, David K. (1999). The Grand Fleet: Warship Design and Development 1906–1922. Annapolis, Maryland: Naval Institute Press. ISBN 1-55750-315-X.
- Burt, R. A. (1986). British Battleships of World War One. Annapolis, Maryland: Naval Institute Press. ISBN 0-87021-863-8.
- Campbell, John (1986). Jutland: An Analysis of the Fighting. Annapolis, Maryland: Naval Institute Press. ISBN 0-87021-324-5.
- Carlyon, Les (2001). Gallipoli. London: Transworld Publishers. ISBN 0-385-60475-0.
- Friedman, Norman (2011). Naval Weapons of World War One: Guns, Torpedoes, Mines and ASW Weapons of All Nations; An Illustrated Directory. Seaforth Publishing. ISBN 978-1-84832-100-7.
- Hythe, Viscount (ed.). The Naval Annual 1914.
- Johnston, Ian & Buxton, Ian (2013). The Battleship Builders - Constructing and Arming British Capital Ships. Annapolis, Maryland: Naval Institute Press. ISBN 978-1-59114-027-6.
- Livermore, Seward W. (1944). "Battleship Diplomacy in South America: 1905–1925". The Journal of Modern History. 16 (1): 31–44. doi:10.1086/236787. ISSN 0022-2801. JSTOR 1870986. OCLC 62219150. S2CID 145007468.
- Massie, Robert K. (2003). Castles of Steel: Britain, Germany, and the Winning of the Great War at Sea. New York: Random House. ISBN 0-679-45671-6.
- Osborne, Eric W. (2004). Cruisers and Battle Cruisers: An Illustrated History of Their Impact. ABC-CLIO. ISBN 1-85109-369-9.
- Parkes, Oscar (1990) [1966]. British Battleships, Warrior 1860 to Vanguard 1950: A History of Design, Construction, and Armament (New & rev. ed.). Annapolis, Maryland: Naval Institute Press. ISBN 1-55750-075-4.
- Preston, Antony (1985). "Great Britain and Empire Forces". In Gray, Randal (ed.). Conway's All the World's Fighting Ships 1906–1921. Annapolis, Maryland: Naval Institute Press. pp. 1–104. ISBN 0-85177-245-5.
- Somervell, Philip (1984). "Naval Affairs in Chilean Politics, 1910–1932". Journal of Latin American Studies. 16 (2): 381–402. doi:10.1017/s0022216x00007112. ISSN 1469-767X. JSTOR 157427. OCLC 47076058. S2CID 145293853.
- Roberts, John (1997). Battlecruisers. Annapolis, Maryland: Naval Institute Press. ISBN 1-55750-068-1.
- Tarrant, V. E. (1986). Battlecruiser Invincible: The History of the First Battlecruiser, 1909–16. Annapolis, Maryland: Naval Institute Press. ISBN 0-87021-147-1.
