= Francis William Kennedy =

Royal Navy Admiral (1862–1939)

Admiral Francis William Kennedy CB
- Born: 15 December 1862
- Died: 11 July 1939 (aged 76)
- Military career
- Allegiance: United Kingdom
- Branch: Royal Navy
- Service years: 1876–1920
- Rank: Admiral
- Commands: HMS Indomitable
- Conflicts: Anglo-Egyptian War; Benin Expedition of 1897; First World War
- Awards: Companion of the Order of the Bath; Mentioned in Despatches (5); Order of Saint Anna, 2nd Class (Russia)

Admiral Francis William Kennedy, CB (15 December 1862 – 11 July 1939) was a Royal Navy officer.

The son of Robert Kennedy, Lord Lieutenant of Kildare, he entered the Royal Navy in January 1876. He participated in the Anglo-Egyptian War and punitive expeditions in Africa.

Kennedy assumed command of the battlecruiser HMS Indomitable in 1912. He participated in the pursuit of Goeben and Breslau in 1914 and the Battle of Jutland in 1916.

He was promoted to vice admiral on 24 March 1920 and retired the following day, and was promoted to admiral on the Retired List 8 May 1925.

A West African flag he brought back from the Benin Expedition of 1897 is in the collection of the National Maritime Museum in London, as is a personal flag of Itsekiri chief and trader Nana Olumu.
