= HMS Inflexible (1907) =

1907 Invincible-class battlecruiser of the Royal Navy

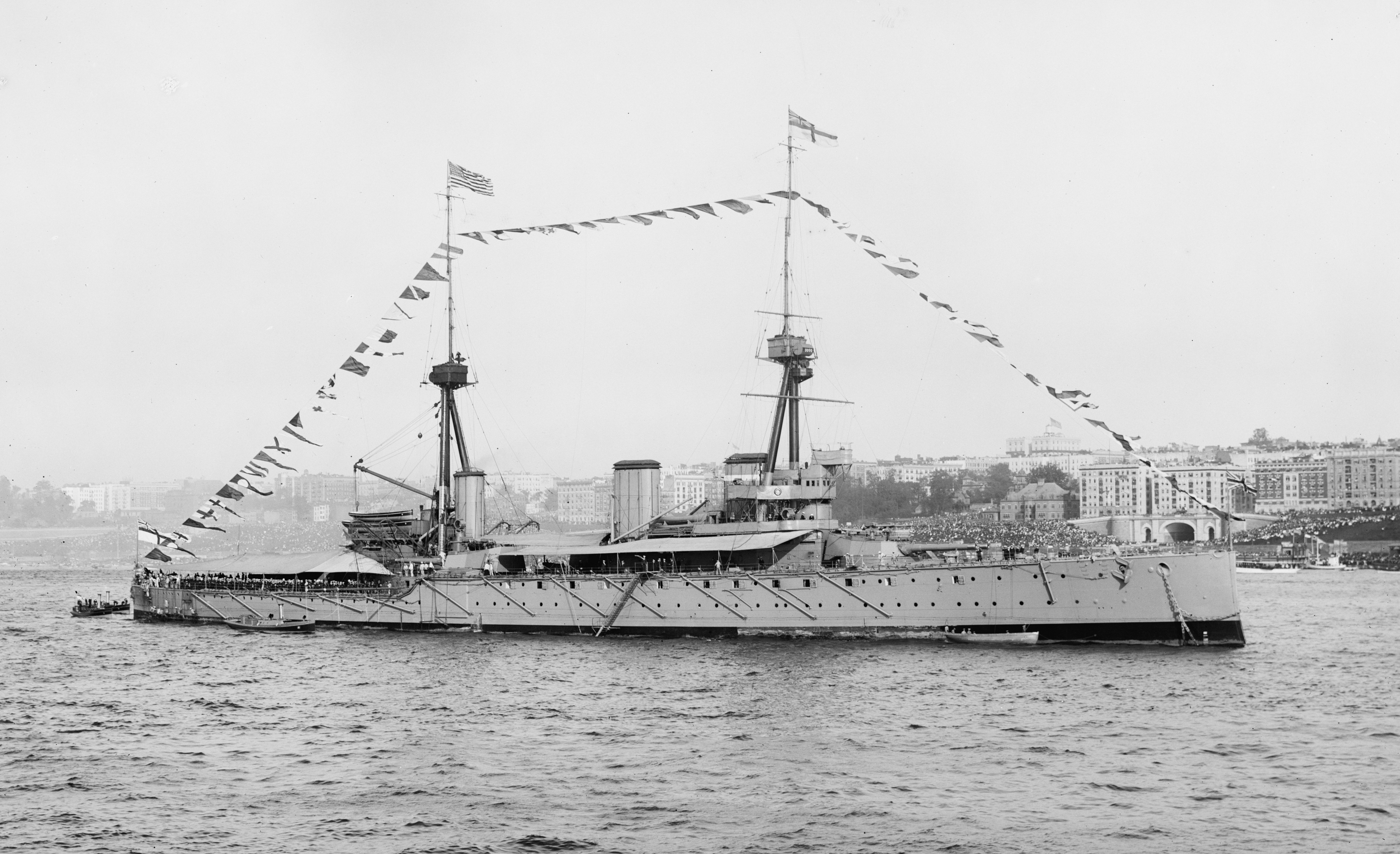
- Inflexible in New York City, 1909

History

United Kingdom
- Name: Inflexible
- Ordered: 1905
- Builder: John Brown & Company, Clyde
- Laid down: 5 February 1906
- Launched: 26 June 1907
- Commissioned: 20 October 1908
- Stricken: 31 March 1920
- Fate: Scrapped, 1922

General characteristics
- Class & type: Invincible-class battlecruiser
- Displacement: 17,290 long tons (17,570 t) (normal); 20,700 long tons (21,000 t) (deep load)
- Length: 530 ft 1 in (161.57 m) (waterline); 567 ft (173 m) o/a
- Beam: 78 ft 10.13 in (24.0317 m)
- Draught: 29 ft 9 in (9.07 m) (deep load)
- Installed power: 31 × Yarrow boilers; 41,000 shp (30,574 kW)
- Propulsion: 4 × shafts; 2 × direct-drive steam turbine sets
- Speed: 26.48 knots (49 km/h; 30 mph) (trials)
- Range: 3,090 nmi (5,720 km; 3,560 mi) at 10 knots (19 km/h; 12 mph)
- Complement: 784
- Armament: 4 × twin 12 in (305 mm) guns; 16 × single 4 in (102 mm) guns; 5 × 18 in (450 mm) torpedo tubes
- Armour: Belt: 4–6 in (102–152 mm); Decks: 1.5–2.5 in (38–64 mm); Barbettes: 7 in (178 mm); Turrets: 7 in (178 mm); Conning tower: 6–10 in (152–254 mm); Torpedo bulkheads: 2.5 in (64 mm)

HMS Inflexible was one of three Invincible-class battlecruisers built for the Royal Navy before World War I and had an active career during the war. She tried to hunt down the German battlecruiser SMS Goeben and the light cruiser SMS Breslau in the Mediterranean Sea when war broke out and she and her sister ship Invincible sank the German armoured cruisers SMS Scharnhorst and SMS Gneisenau during the Battle of the Falkland Islands. Inflexible bombarded Turkish forts in the Dardanelles in 1915, but was damaged by return fire and struck a mine while maneuvering. She had to be beached to prevent her from sinking, but she was patched up and sent to Malta, and then Gibraltar for more permanent repairs. Transferred to the Grand Fleet afterwards, she damaged the German battlecruiser Lützow during the Battle of Jutland in 1916 and watched Invincible explode. She was deemed obsolete after the war and was sold for scrap in 1921.

== Design ==
The Invincible-class ships were formally known as armoured cruisers until 1911 when they were redesignated as battlecruisers by an Admiralty order of 24 November 1911. Unofficially a number of designations were used until then, including cruiser-battleship, dreadnought cruiser and battle-cruiser.

=== General characteristics ===
Inflexible was significantly larger than her armoured cruiser predecessors of the Minotaur class. She had an overall length of 567 ft (173 m), a beam of 78 ft 10.13 in (24.0 m), and a draught of 29 ft 9 in (9.07 m) at deep load. She displaced 17,290 long tons (17,570 t) at load and 20,700 long tons (21,000 t) at deep load, nearly 3,000 long tons (3,000 t) more than the earlier ships.

=== Propulsion ===
Inflexible had two paired sets of Parsons direct-drive turbines, each of which was housed in a separate engine-room and drove an outboard and inboard shaft. The high-pressure ahead and astern turbines were coupled to the outboard shafts and the low-pressure turbines to the inner shafts. A cruising turbine was also coupled to each inner shaft; these were not used often and were eventually disconnected. The turbines were powered by thirty-one Yarrow water-tube boilers in four boiler rooms. The turbines were designed to produce a total of 41,000 shaft horsepower (30,574 kW), but reached nearly 47,000 shp (35,048 kW) during her trials in 1908. She was designed for 25 knots (46 km/h; 29 mph), but reached 26.48 knots (49 km/h; 30 mph) during trials. She carried 3,084 long tons (3,133 t) of coal, and an additional 725 long tons (737 t) of fuel oil that was to be sprayed on the coal to increase its burn rate. At full fuel capacity, she could steam for 3,090 nautical miles (5,720 km; 3,560 mi) at a speed of 10 knots (19 km/h; 12 mph).

=== Armament ===
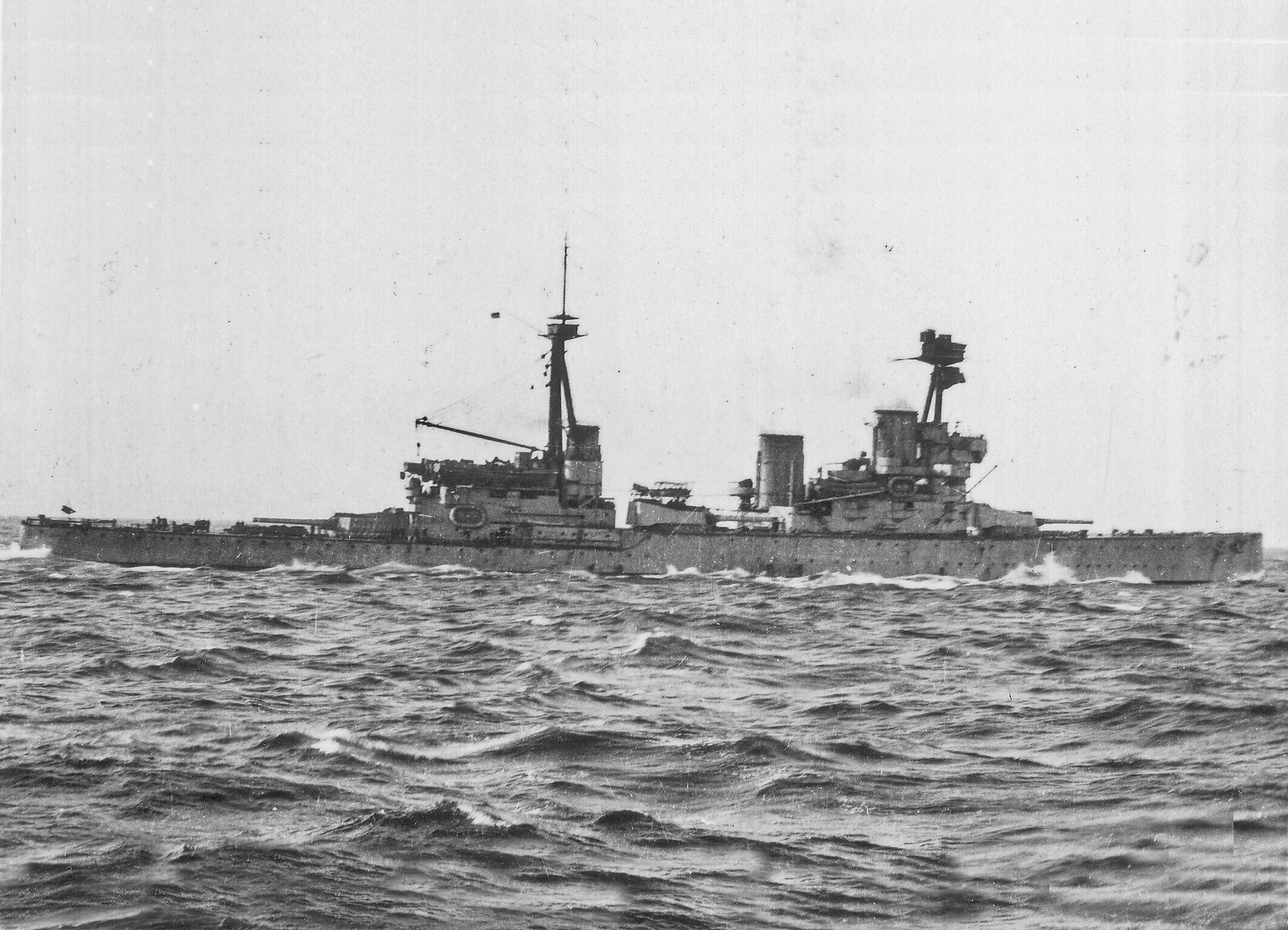
Inflexible in full profile

Inflexible mounted eight BL 12-inch (305 mm) Mk X guns in four twin hydraulically powered turrets. Her secondary armament consisted of sixteen 4-inch (102 mm) QF Mk III guns. In 1915, the turret roof guns were transferred to the superstructure, and the total number of guns was reduced to twelve. All of the remaining guns were enclosed in casemates and given blast shields at that time to better protect the gun crews from weather and enemy action. These guns were replaced by twelve 4-inch BL MK IX guns on CPI mountings during 1917.

Her anti-aircraft armament consisted of a single QF 3-inch (76 mm) 20 cwt AA gun on a high-angle MKII mount at the aft end of the superstructure that was carried from July 1915. A 3-pounder Hotchkiss gun on a high-angle MkIc mounting with a maximum elevation of 60° was fitted in November 1914 and used until August 1917. A 4-inch BL MK VII on a HA MkII mount was added in April 1917. Five 18-inch (457.2 mm) submerged torpedo tubes were fitted on the Invincibles, two on each side and one in the stern. Fourteen torpedoes were carried for them.

=== Armour ===
The armour protection given to the Invincibles was heavier than that of the Minotaurs; their waterline belt measured 6 in (152 mm) amidships in contrast to the 4 in (102 mm) belt of their predecessors. The belt was 6 inches thick roughly between the fore and aft 12-inch gun turrets, but was reduced to four inches from the fore turret to the bow, but did not extend aft of the rear turret. The gun turrets and barbettes were protected by 7 in (178 mm) of armour, except for the turret roofs which used 3 in (76 mm) of Krupp non-cemented armour (KNC). The thickness of the main deck was 1–2 in (25–51 mm) and the lower deck armour was 1.5–2.5 in (38–64 mm). Mild steel torpedo bulkheads of 2.5-inch thickness were fitted abreast the magazines and shell rooms.

After the Battle of Jutland revealed her vulnerability to plunging shellfire, additional armour was added in the area of the magazines and to the turret roofs. The exact thickness is not known, but it was unlikely to be thick as the total amount was less than 100 long tons (102 t).

== Construction and career ==
She was authorized in the naval expansion program of 1905, and built at the John Brown & Company shipyard on the Clyde. She was laid down on 5 February 1906, launched on 26 June 1907, and commissioned on 20 October 1908. Inflexible was initially assigned to the Nore Division of the British Home Fleet. She was the temporary flagship of Admiral of the Fleet Sir Edward Hobart Seymour while in New York for the Hudson–Fulton Celebration in September 1909. On 26 May 1911, she was in a collision with the battleship Bellerophon that damaged her bow. She was refitted in October–November 1911, where her fore funnel was also raised by 6 feet (1.8 m) to reduce smoke interference with the bridge.

=== First World War ===
==== Pursuit of Goeben and Breslau ====
On the outbreak of the First World War, Inflexible was flagship of the Mediterranean Fleet. Accompanied by Indefatigable, under the command of Admiral Sir Archibald Berkeley Milne she encountered the German battlecruiser Goeben and the light cruiser Breslau on the morning of 4 August 1914 headed east after a cursory bombardment of the French Algerian port of Philippeville, but Britain and Germany were not yet at war so Milne turned to shadow the Germans as they headed back to Messina to recoal. All three battlecruisers had problems with their boilers, but Goeben and Breslau were able to break contact and reached Messina by the morning of the 5th. By this time, war had been declared, after the German invasion of Belgium, but an Admiralty order to respect Italian neutrality and stay outside a 6-nautical-mile (11 km) limit from the Italian coast precluded entrance into the passage of the Strait of Messina where they could observe the port directly. Therefore, Milne stationed Inflexible and Indefatigable at the northern exit of the Strait of Messina, still expecting the Germans to break out to the west where they could attack French troop transports, the light cruiser Gloucester at the southern exit and sent Indomitable to recoal at Bizerte where she was better positioned to react to a German sortie into the Western Mediterranean.

The Germans sortied from Messina on 6 August and headed east, towards Constantinople, trailed by Gloucester. Milne, still expecting Rear Admiral Wilhelm Souchon to turn west, kept the battlecruisers at Malta until shortly after midnight on 8 August when he set sail for Cape Matapan at a leisurely 12 knots (22 km/h), where Goeben had been spotted eight hours earlier. At 14:30, he received an incorrect signal from the Admiralty stating that Britain was at war with Austria; war would not be declared until 12 August and the order was countermanded four hours later, but Milne followed his standing orders to guard the Adriatic against an Austrian breakout attempt, rather than seek Goeben. Finally on 9 August, Milne was given clear orders to "chase Goeben which had passed Cape Matapan on the 7th steering north-east". Milne still did not believe that Souchon was heading for the Dardanelles, and so he resolved to guard the exit from the Aegean, unaware that the Goeben did not intend to come out. Indomitable remained in the Mediterranean to blockade the Dardanelles, but Inflexible was ordered home on 18 August.

=== Battle of the Falklands ===
The West Indies Squadron of Rear Admiral Christopher Cradock was destroyed by the German East Asia Squadron commanded by Admiral Graf von Spee during the Battle of Coronel on 1 November 1914. In response, the Admiralty ordered that a squadron be sent to destroy the Germans. The squadron, under the command of Admiral Sir Doveton Sturdee, consisted of Invincible (flag) and Inflexible. They departed on 11 November and rendezvoused with several other cruisers under Rear Admiral Stoddard at Abrolhos Rocks, off the coast of Brazil on the 26th. They departed the following day and reached Port Stanley on the morning of 7 December.

Spee – making a leisurely voyage back to the Atlantic – wished to destroy the radio station at Port Stanley, so he sent the armoured cruiser SMS Gneisenau and the light cruiser Nürnberg to see if the harbor was clear of British warships on the morning of 8 December. They were spotted at 07:30, although the pre-dreadnought Canopus, grounded in Stanley Harbor to defend the town and its wireless station, did not receive the signal until 07:45. It mattered little because Sturdee was not expecting an engagement and most of his ships were coaling. Furthermore, the armoured cruiser Cornwall and the light cruiser Bristol had one or both of their engines under repair. The armed merchant cruiser Macedonian was patrolling the outer harbor entrance while the armoured cruiser Kent was anchored in the outer harbor, scheduled to relieve the Macedonian at 08:00. The Germans were not expecting any resistance and the first salvo from Canopus's guns at 09:20 caused them to sheer off from their planned bombardment of the wireless station and fall back on Spee's main body.

Sturdee's ships did not sortie from the harbor until 09:50, but they could see the retreating German ships on the southwest horizon. The Invincibles, fresh out of dry dock, had a 5 knots (9.3 km/h; 5.8 mph) advantage over Spee's ships which all had fouled bottoms that limited their speeds to 20 knots (37 km/h; 23 mph) at best. The light cruiser Leipzig was lagging behind the other ships and Inflexible opened fire on her when the range dropped to 17,500 yards (16,000 m) at 12:55. Invincible opened fire shortly afterwards and both ships began straddling Leipzig as the range closed to 13,000 yards (12,000 m). At 13:20, Spee ordered his squadron to separate and ordered his light cruisers to turn to the southwest while his armoured cruisers turned to the north east to cover their retreat. The German ships opened fire first at 13:30 and scored their first hit at 13:44 when SMS Scharnhorst hit Invincible, although the shell burst harmlessly on the belt armour. Both sides fired rapidly during the first half-hour of the engagement before Sturdee opened up the range a little to put his ships outside the effective range of the German guns. British gunnery was very poor during this period, scoring only four hits out of 210 rounds fired. The primary cause was the smoke from the guns and funnels as the British were downwind of the Germans.

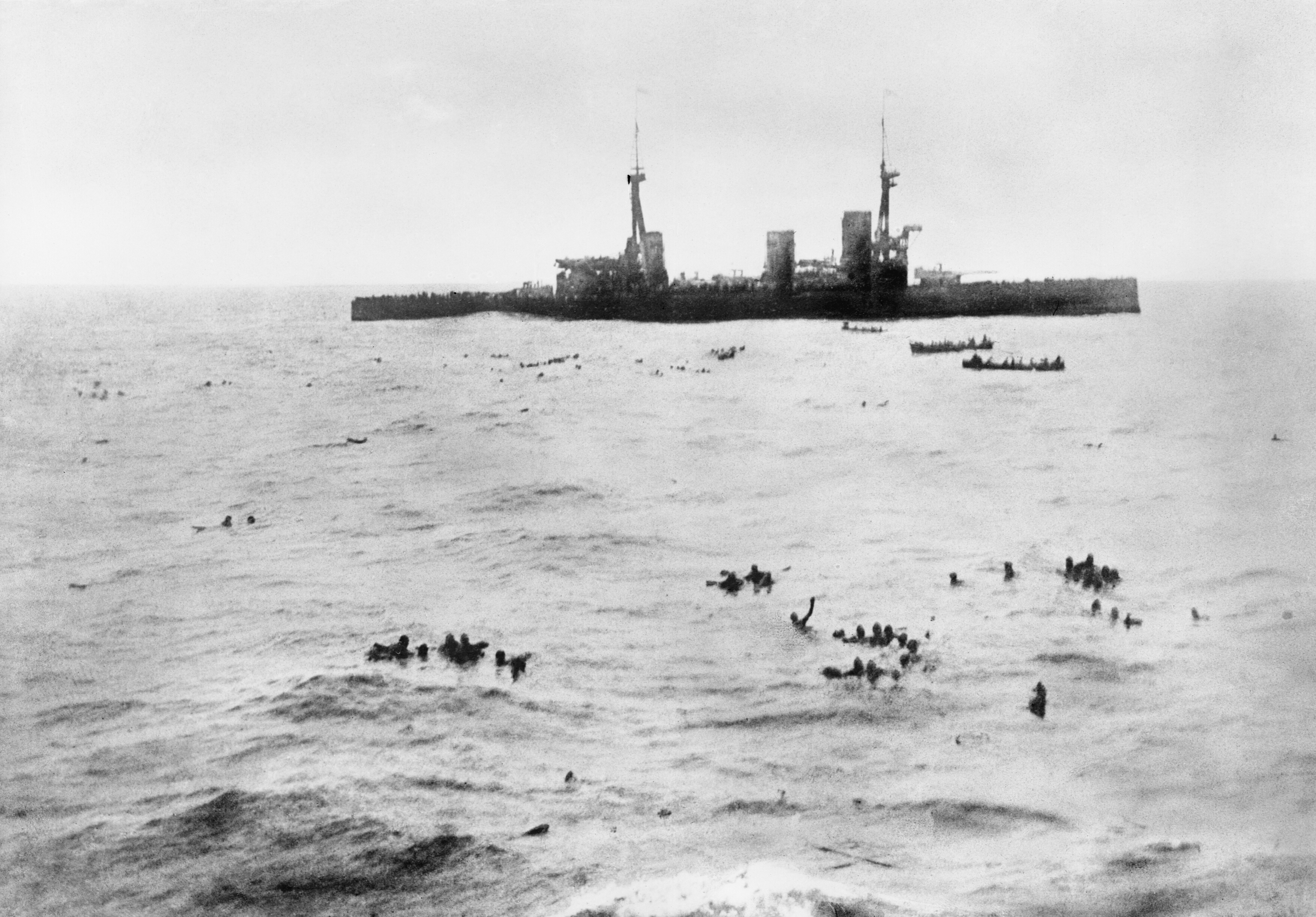
Inflexible recovering survivors from the Gneisenau

Spee turned to the south in the hope of disengaging while the British had their vision obscured, but only opened the range to 17,000 yards (16,000 m) before the British saw his course change. This was futile as the British battlecruisers gave chase at 24 knots (44 km/h; 28 mph). Forty minutes later, the British opened fire again at 15,000 yards (14,000 m). Eight minutes later, Spee turned again to the east to give battle; this time, his strategy was to close the range on the British ships so he could bring his 15 cm (5.9 in) secondary armament to bear. He was successful, and they were able to open fire at 15:00 at maximum elevation. On this course, the smoke bothered both sides, but multiple hits were made regardless. Those made by the Germans either failed to detonate or hit in some insignificant area. On the contrary, Gneisenau had her starboard engine room put out of action. Sturdee ordered his ships at 15:15 back across their own wakes to gain the windward advantage. Spee turned to the northwest, as if to attempt to cross the British T, but actually to bring Scharnhorst's undamaged starboard guns to bear as most of those on his port side were out of action. The British continued to hit Scharnhorst and Gneisenau regularly during this time and Scharnhorst ceased fire at 16:00 before capsizing at 16:17 with no survivors. Gneisenau had been slowed by earlier damage and was battered for another hour and a half by Inflexible and Invincible at ranges down to 4,000 yards (3,700 m). Despite the damage her crew continued to fire back until she ceased firing at 16:47. Sturdee was ready to order 'Cease fire' at 17:15 when an ammunition hoist was freed up and she made her last shot. The British continued to pound her until 17:50, after her captain had given the order to scuttle her at 17:40. She slowly capsized at 18:00 and the British were able to rescue 176 men. She had fired 661 twelve-inch shells during the battle and had only been hit three times because she was often obscured by Invincible's smoke. Only one man was killed and five wounded aboard the battlecruisers during the battle.

=== Dardanelles Campaign ===
After the Battle of the Falklands Inflexible was repaired and refitted at Gibraltar. She arrived at the Dardanelles on 24 January 1915 where she replaced Indefatigable as the flagship of the Mediterranean Fleet. She bombarded Turkish fortifications on 19 February, the start of the Battle of Gallipoli, to little effect, and again on 15 March, with the same results. She was part of the first line of British ships on 18 March as they attempted to suppress the Turkish guns so the minefields could be swept. Turkish return fire was heavy and she was hit a number of times. A 15 cm (5.9 in) howitzer shell knocked out the left gun of 'P' turret, a 105 mm (4.1 in) shell hit the yard above the foretop and killed or wounded everybody within. A heavy shell of unknown size hit her on the port side 6 feet (1.8 m) below the waterline, but only dished in the side plating. A 240 mm (9.4 in) shell hit the foremast at the same level as the flying bridge and set fire to the navigator's sea cabin. The hit destroyed all the cables and voice pipes running through the foremast to the fire control director. The smoke from the fire was choking the wounded so she withdrew to turn her head into the wind and the fire was then quickly put out. She returned to reengage the Turkish forts and was hit once more with little effect. Later, as she was turning in Eren Keui Bay, she was seriously damaged by a mine – probably about 100 kg (220 lb) in size – that blew a large hole in her starboard bow and flooded the forward torpedo flat, drowning 39 men. She had to be beached at the island of Bozcaada (Tenedos) to prevent her sinking, as she had taken in some 1,600 long tons (1,600 t) of water, but she was temporarily repaired with a cofferdam over the 30-by-26-foot (9.1 m × 7.9 m) hole. She sailed to Malta, escorted by Canopus and Talbot on 6 April. She nearly foundered when her cofferdam worked loose in heavy weather en route and had to be towed stern-first by Canopus for six hours while the cofferdam was repaired. She was under repair at Malta until early June before she sailed for home. She reached the U.K. on 19 June, where she joined the 3rd Battlecruiser Squadron (BCS) of the Grand Fleet under the command of Rear Admiral H.L.A. Hood.

=== Battle of Jutland ===
At the end of May 1916, the 3rd BCS was temporarily assigned to the Grand Fleet for gunnery practice. On 30 May, the entire Grand Fleet, along with Admiral Beatty's battlecruisers, was ordered to sea to prepare for an excursion by the German High Seas Fleet. In order to support Beatty, Admiral Hood took his three battlecruisers ahead of the Grand Fleet. At about 14:30, (Note: The times used in this section are in UTC, which is one hour behind CET, which is often used in German works.) Invincible intercepted a radio message from the light cruiser Galatea, attached to Beatty's Battlecruiser Force, reporting the sighting of two enemy cruisers. This was amplified by other reports of seven enemy ships steering north. Hood interpreted this as an attempt to escape through the Skagerrak and ordered an increase in speed to 22 knots (41 km/h; 25 mph) at 15:11 and steered East-Southeast to cut off the fleeing ships. Twenty minutes later, Invincible intercepted a message from Beatty reporting five enemy battlecruisers in sight and later signals reporting that he was engaging the enemy on a south-easterly course. At 16:06, Hood ordered full speed and a course of south-southeast in an attempt to converge on Beatty. At 16:56, with no British ships in sight, Hood requested Beatty's course, position and speed, but he never received a reply.

Hood continued on course until 17:40, when gunfire was spotted in the direction to which his light cruiser Chester had been dispatched to investigate other gunfire flashes. Chester encountered four light cruisers of Hipper's 2nd Scouting Group and was badly damaged before Hood turned to investigate and was able to drive the German cruisers away. At 17:53, Invincible opened fire on Wiesbaden; the other two Invincibles followed two minutes later. The German ships turned for the south after fruitlessly firing torpedoes at 18:00 and attempted to find shelter in the mist. As they turned, Invincible hit Wiesbaden in the engine room and knocked out her engines while Inflexible hit Pillau once. The 2nd Scouting Group was escorted by the light cruiser Regensburg and 31 destroyers of the 2nd and 9th Flotillas and the 12th Half-Flotilla which attacked the 3rd BCS in succession. They were driven off by Hood's remaining light cruiser Canterbury and the five destroyers of his escort. In a confused action, the Germans only launched 12 torpedoes and disabled the destroyer Shark with gunfire. Having turned due west to close on Beatty's ships, the Invincibles were broadside to the oncoming torpedoes, but Invincible turned north, while Inflexible and Indomitable turned south to present their narrowest profile to the torpedoes. All the torpedoes missed, although one passed underneath Inflexible without detonating. As Invincible turned north, her helm jammed and she had to come to a stop to fix the problem, but this was quickly done and the squadron reformed heading west.

At 18:21, with both Beatty and the Grand Fleet converging on him, Hood turned south to lead Beatty's battlecruisers. Hipper's battlecruisers were 9,000 yards (8.2 km) away and the Invincibles almost immediately opened fire on Hipper's flagship, Lützow, and Derfflinger. Lützow quickly took ten hits from Lion, Inflexible and Invincible, including two hits below the waterline forward by Invincible that would ultimately doom her. But at 18:30, Invincible abruptly appeared as a clear target before Lützow and Derfflinger. The two German ships then fired three salvoes each at Invincible, and sank her in 90 seconds. A 305 mm (12-inch) shell from the third salvo struck the roof of Invincible's midships 'Q' turret, flash detonated the magazines below, and the ship blew up and broke in two, killing all but six of her crew of 1,032 officers and men, including Rear-Admiral Hood.

Inflexible and Indomitable remained in company with Beatty for the rest of the battle. They encountered Hipper's battlecruisers only 10,000 yards (9.1 km) away as the sun was setting about 8:19 and opened fire. Seydlitz was hit five times before the German battlecruisers were rescued by the appearance of the pre-dreadnought battleships of Rear Admiral Mauve and the British shifted fire to the new threat. Three of the predreadnoughts were hit before they too were able to turn into the gloom.

=== Post-Jutland career ===
The loss of three battlecruisers at Jutland (the others were Queen Mary and Indefatigable) led to the force being reorganised into two squadrons, with Inflexible and Indomitable in the 2nd BCS. However, after Jutland there was little significant naval activity for the Invincibles, other than routine patrolling, thanks to the Kaiser's order that his ships should not be allowed to go to sea unless assured of victory. Two torpedoes fired by the German U-boat U-65 during one of these patrols on 19 August 1916 missed astern. On 1 February 1918, she collided with the British submarine HMS K22 off the Isle of May with minor damage. This was during a night exercise in the Firth of Forth involving the Flotilla, eight capital ships, and numerous cruisers and destroyers. It was a series of collisions which led to the loss of two K boats, serious damage to three others, including K22, and a cruiser, and the deaths of 104 submariners, with no enemy involved. She was fitted with two flying off ramps fitted above her midships turrets in early 1918. On 21 November she was present at Scapa Flow for the surrender of the German High Seas Fleet.

The end of the war saw the end for many of the older vessels, not least the two remaining Invincible-class ships. Inflexible was paid off to the Reserve Fleet in January 1919 before being decommissioned on 31 March 1920. Chile briefly considered purchasing the ship in 1920, however the sale did not materialise. She was sold for scrap on 1 December 1921, and scrapped in Germany the following year. Mount Inflexible in the Canadian Rockies was named after the battlecruiser in 1917.

== Bibliography ==
- Burt, R. A. (1986). British Battleships of World War One. Annapolis, Maryland: Naval Institute Press. ISBN 0-87021-863-8.
- Campbell, John (1986). Jutland: An Analysis of the Fighting. Annapolis, Maryland: Naval Institute Press. ISBN 0-87021-324-5.
- Johnston, Ian & Buxton, Ian (2013). The Battleship Builders – Constructing and Arming British Capital Ships. Annapolis, Maryland: Naval Institute Press. ISBN 978-1-59114-027-6.
- Massie, Robert K. (2003). Castles of Steel: Britain, Germany, and the Winning of the Great War at Sea. New York: Random House. ISBN 0-679-45671-6.
- Preston, Antony (1985). "Great Britain and Empire Forces". In Gray, Randal (ed.). Conway's All the World's Fighting Ships 1906–1921. Annapolis, Maryland: Naval Institute Press. pp. 1–104. ISBN 0-85177-245-5.
- Johnston, Ian (2011). Clydebank Battlecruisers: Forgotten Photographs from John Brown's Shipyard (Hardcover). Annapolis, Maryland: Naval Institute Press. ISBN 978-1591141204.
- Roberts, John (1997). Battlecruisers. Annapolis, Maryland: Naval Institute Press. ISBN 1-55750-068-1.
- Tarrant, V. E. (1986). Battlecruiser Invincible: The History of the First Battlecruiser, 1909–16. Annapolis, Maryland: Naval Institute Press. ISBN 0-87021-147-1.
- From the Royal Navy log book for HMS Inflexible, 7 and 8 December 1914. Transcribed by the Old Weather^{[?]} project. The Inflexible's ship log and captain's after action report have been transcribed and are available at this link.
- From the Royal Navy log book for HMS Inflexible, 18 to 21 March 1915. Transcribed by the Old Weather^{[?]} project. The Inflexible's ship log have been transcribed and are available at this link.
