= HMS Canterbury (1915) =

Royal Navy C-class light cruiser

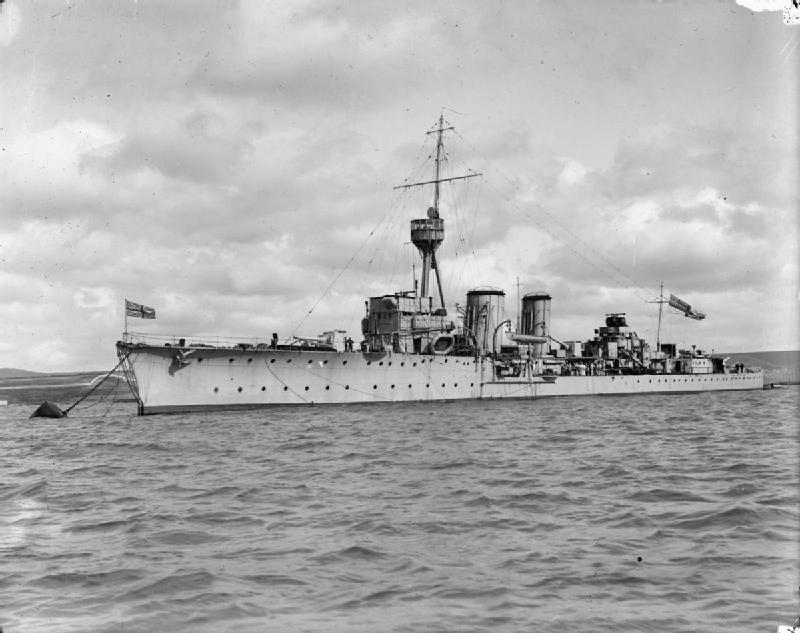
- Canterbury sometime between 1916 and 1918

History

United Kingdom
- Name: Canterbury
- Builder: John Brown & Company, Clydebank, Scotland
- Laid down: 14 October 1914
- Launched: 21 December 1915
- Completed: April or May 1916
- Commissioned: April or May 1916
- Decommissioned: 1922
- Recommissioned: May 1924
- Decommissioned: June 1925 (estimated)
- Recommissioned: November 1926
- Decommissioned: March 1931
- Recommissioned: August 1932?
- Decommissioned: December 1933
- Identification: Pennant number: 0A (1914); 27 (Jan 18); 59 (Apr 18); P01 (Nov 19).
- Fate: Sold 27 July 1934 for scrapping

General characteristics
- Class & type: C-class light cruiser
- Displacement: 3,750 tons
- Length: 446 ft (136 m)
- Beam: 41.5 ft (12.6 m)
- Draught: 15 ft (4.6 m)
- Installed power: 8 Yarrow boilers; 40,000 shp (30,000 kW)
- Propulsion: 4 screws; 2 steam turbines
- Speed: 28.5 knots (52.8 km/h; 32.8 mph)
- Complement: 323
- Armament: 4 × 6 in (152 mm) guns; 1 × 4 in (102 mm) gun; 2 × 3 in (76 mm) guns; 2 × 2 pdr (40 mm (1.6 in)) AA guns; 6 × 21 in (533 mm) torpedo tubes
- Armour: 3 inch side (amidships); 2¼-1½ inch side (bows); 2½ - 2 inch side (stern); 1 inch upper decks (amidships); 1 inch deck over rudder

HMS Canterbury was a C-class light cruiser of the Royal Navy that saw service in the First World War and the Russian Civil War. She was part of the Cambrian group of the C class.

== Construction ==
Canterbury was laid down on 28 October 1914, launched on 21 December 1915, and completed in May 1916. Unlike the rest of the Cambrian subclass, Canterbury was armed with six torpedo tubes instead of the usual four.

== Service history ==
=== World War I ===
Commissioned into the Royal Navy in April or May (sources differ) 1916, Canterbury was attached to the 3rd Battle Squadron in the Grand Fleet, commanded by Captain Percy M. R. Royds, and participated in the Battle of Jutland on 31 May – 1 June 1916. From 1916 to 1918, she was assigned to the 5th Light Cruiser Squadron, operating as part of Harwich Force in the North Sea to defend the eastern approaches to the Strait of Dover and English Channel. On 5 June 1917, she and the light cruisers HMS Centaur and HMS Conquest sank the German torpedo boat S 20 in the North Sea near the Shouwen Bank off Zeebrugge, Belgium. On St George's day, 23 April 1918, she was present at the great naval raid on Zeebrugge and Ostend. Later in 1918, she was assigned to operate in the Aegean Sea, where she served out the rest of the war.

=== Postwar ===
After the First World War, Canterbury served in the Black Sea in 1919 during the British intervention in the Russian Civil War. She commissioned at Portsmouth in November 1919 for service in the 1st Light Cruiser Squadron in the Atlantic Fleet. She was attached to the Gunnery School at Portsmouth from 1920 to 1922, then in the Portsmouth Reserve from 1922 to 1924. Following a refit, her 3 funnels were reduced to two. She was recommissioned again at Portsmouth in May 1924 to serve in the 2nd Cruiser Squadron in the Atlantic Fleet, before beginning another refit in June 1925.

Canterbury recommissioned out of the Nore Reserve in November 1926 for another tour of duty in the Atlantic Fleet with the 2nd Cruiser Squadron. She transported troops to China from 1930 to 1931, reentered the Nore Reserve in March 1931, and resumed duty carrying troops in August 1932. She was decommissioned in December 1933.

== Disposal ==
Canterbury was sold on 27 July 1934 to Metal Industries of Rosyth, Scotland, for scrapping.

== Preservation ==
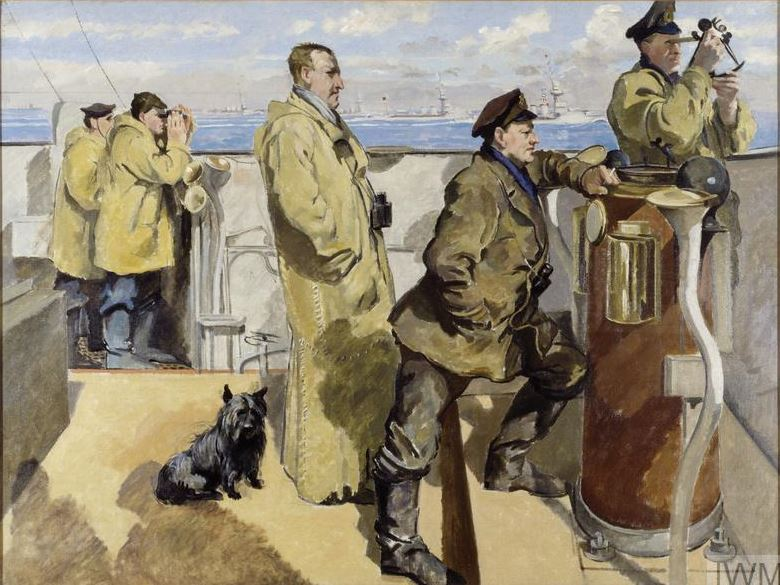
The bridge during the raid on Zeebrugge

Canterbury's ship's bell is preserved at Canterbury Cathedral in Canterbury, England, and her ship's badge is on display at the National Maritime Museum in Greenwich, England.
