= 1st Battlecruiser Squadron =

Former battlecruiser formation of the Royal Navy

First Battlecruiser Squadron
- White Ensign
- Active: 1909–1919
- Country: United Kingdom
- Allegiance: British Empire
- Branch: Royal Navy

Commanders
- Notable commanders: David Beatty

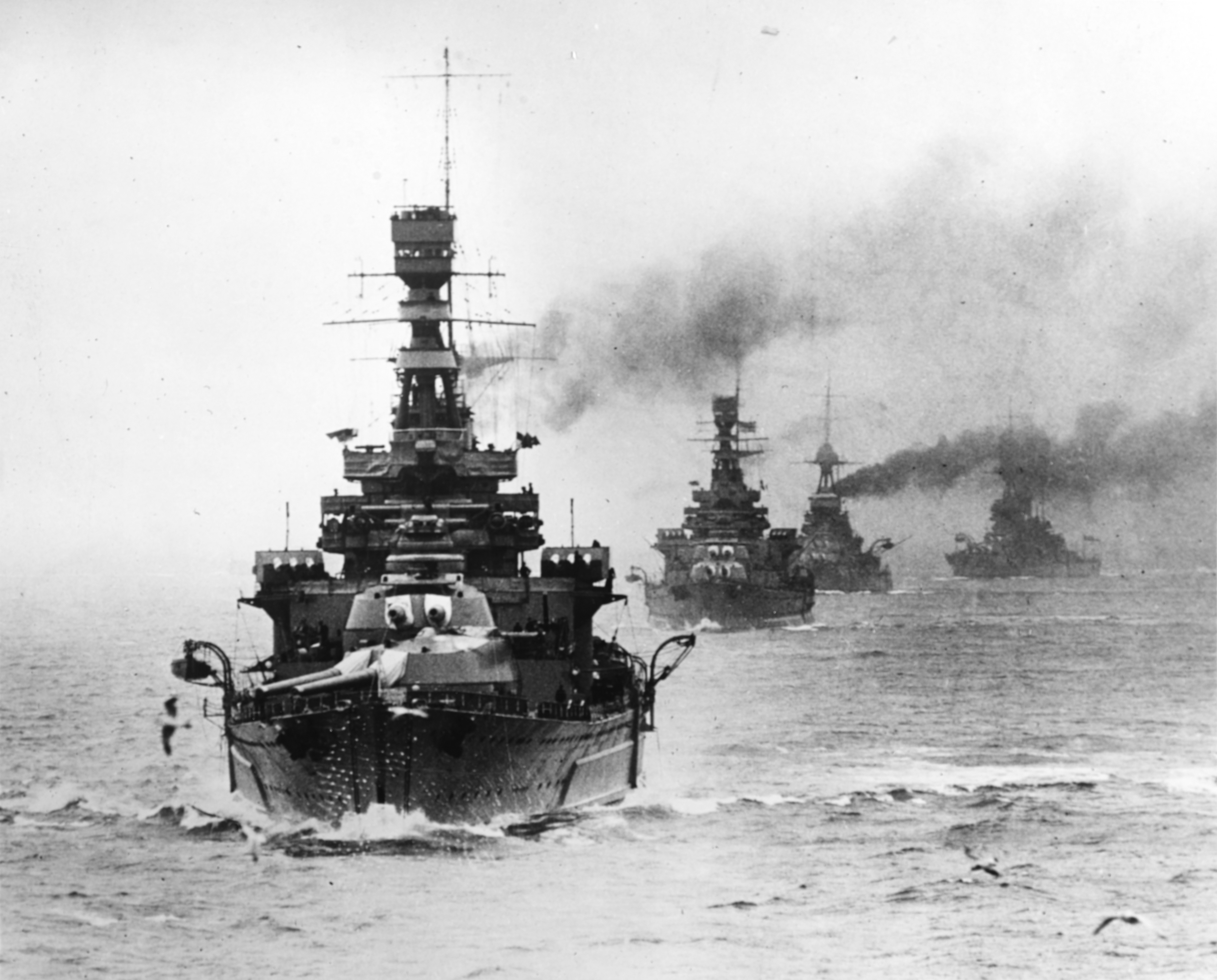
HMS Repulse

The First Battlecruiser Squadron was a Royal Navy squadron of battlecruisers that saw service as part of the Grand Fleet during the First World War. It was created in 1909 as the First Cruiser Squadron and was renamed in 1913 to First Battle Cruiser Squadron. It participated in the battles of Heligoland Bight, Dogger Bank and the Battle of Jutland. After the end of the war it became the sole Battlecruiser Squadron.

== Formation ==
The first two British battlecruisers of the Invincible class—Inflexible and Indomitable—were commissioned into the Nore Division of the Home Fleet in October 1908. In early 1909, the Nore Division became the First Division of a reorganised Home Fleet, and Inflexible and Indomitable were transferred to the new First Cruiser Squadron in March 1909; they were joined by their recently completed sister Invincible. Also part of the squadron were the armoured cruisers Minotaur and Drake (flagship). Rear-Admiral the Honourable Stanley Colville took command of the squadron on 24 February and transferred his flag to Indomitable on 29 July. Drake then became flagship of the Fifth Cruiser Squadron in the Atlantic Fleet.

On 24 February 1911, Rear-Admiral Lewis Bayly assumed command of the First Cruiser Squadron, which had been joined in February by the new Indefatigable-class battlecruiser Indefatigable. Upon joining on 4 June 1912, Lion became Rear-Admiral Bayly's flagship. Princess Royal joined on 14 November. A reorganisation of the fleet renamed the First Cruiser Squadron to First Battlecruiser Squadron on 1 January 1913. During 1913 gradually all the older battlecruisers left to join the Second Battlecruiser Squadron in the Mediterranean Fleet. Rear-Admiral David Beatty was selected to command the squadron and succeeded Bayly on 1 March 1913. The near-sister to the Lion class—Queen Mary—joined on 4 September.

== First World War ==
The First Battlecruiser Squadron at the outbreak of war was composed of the four newest battlecruisers in the Royal Navy. On 3 October, it was joined by the recently completed Tiger. The squadron took part in the successful Battle of Heligoland Bight against the Imperial German Navy on 28 August 1914 and participated in the abortive attempt to engage the Germans during their bombardment of Scarborough, Whitby and Hartlepool on 16 December. On 15 January 1915, New Zealand left to become flagship of the Second Battlecruiser Squadron and was joined by Indomitable, which had served with the First Battlecruiser Squadron over the New Year.

The Squadron took part in the Battle of Dogger Bank, where Beatty's battlecruisers forced the Germans to retreat, and in the process sank the German armoured cruiser SMS Blücher, while Lion suffered heavy damage. As a result of the battle, in February the battlecruiser force was reorganised, and a Battlecruiser Fleet (BCF) was incorporated, with Beatty reappointed to command it. Captain Osmond De B. Brock of Princess Royal was appointed Commodore, First Class and given command of the First Battlecruiser Squadron, until he was promoted to the rank of Rear-Admiral in March. At the Battle of Jutland on 31 May 1916, all ships were damaged by German shell fire as the First Battle Squadron under Rear-Admiral Brock and Beatty in Lion lead the British line against the enemy. Early in the action, Queen Mary was lost and all but a small number of her crew were killed. Two other battlecruisers—Invincible and Indefatigable—were sunk during the battle.

The squadron's losses were made up for by the arrival of the new battlecruisers Repulse and Renown in September 1916 and January 1917 respectively. Brock was replaced by Rear-Admiral Richard F. Phillimore. When Phillimore left to become Rear-Admiral Commanding, Aircraft Carriers, he was superseded by Rear-Admiral Henry Oliver on 14 March 1918.

== Composition ==
=== March 1909 ===
- Drake. Flying the flag of Rear-Admiral the Honourable Stanley C. J. Colville.
- Minotaur. Captain William O. Boothby.
- Indomitable. Captain Herbert G. King-Hall.
- Inflexible. Captain Henry H. Torlesse.
- Invincible. Captain Mark E. F. Kerr.

=== July 1909 ===
- Indomitable. Flying the flag of Rear-Admiral the Honourable Stanley C. J. Colville. Captain C. M. de Bartolomé.
- Minotaur. Captain William O. Boothby.
- Inflexible. Captain Henry H. Torlesse.
- Invincible. Captain Mark E. F. Kerr.

=== August 1914 ===
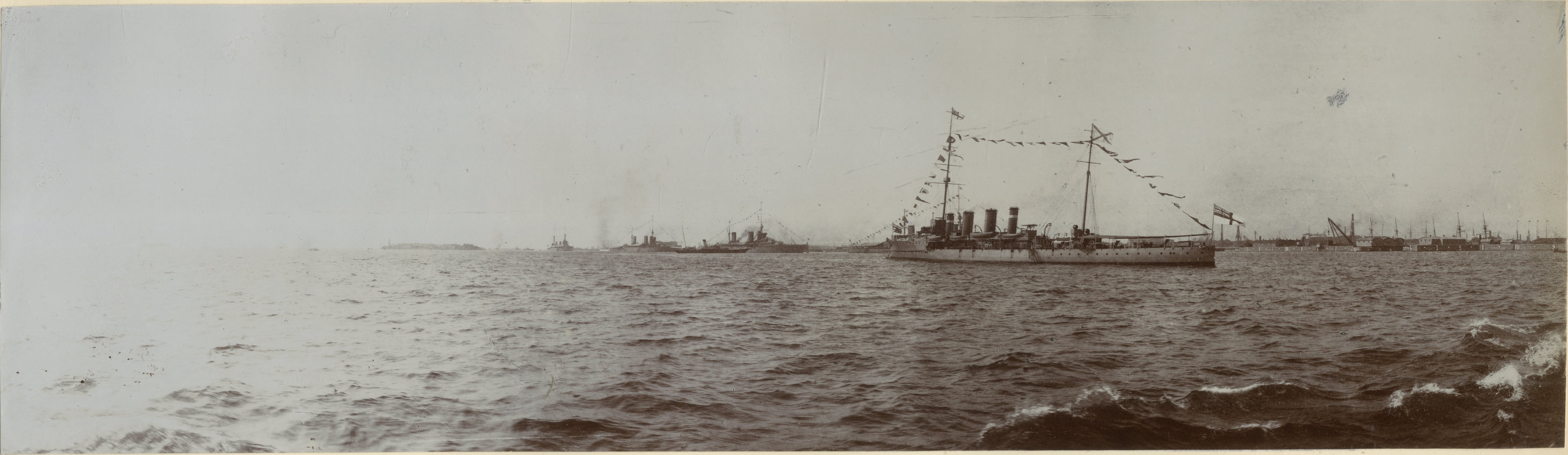
The squadron in Kronstadt, Russia, in June 1914. HMS Boadicea is in the foreground

- Lion. Captain A. E. M. Chatfield.
- Princess Royal. Captain Osmond De B. Brock.
- Queen Mary. Captain W. R. Hall.
- New Zealand. Captain Lionel Halsey.

=== Battle of Jutland ===
- Lion. Flying the flag of Vice-Admiral Sir David Beatty. Captain A. E. M. Chatfield.
- Princess Royal Flying the flag of Rear-Admiral Osmond De B. Brock. Captain W. H. Cowan.
- Queen Mary. Captain Cecil I. Prowse.
- Tiger. Captain Henry B. Pelly.

=== January 1918 ===
- Repulse. Flying the Flag of Rear-Admiral Richard F. Phillimore. Captain John S. Dumaresq (Temporary).
- Renown. Captain Michael H. Hodges.
- Princess Royal. Captain Sidney R. Drury-Lowe (Temporary).
- Tiger. Captain Arthur A. M. Duff.

=== November 1918 ===
- Repulse. Flying the flag of Rear-Admiral Henry F. Oliver. Captain William H. D. Boyle.
- Renown. Captain Arthur W. Craig.
- Princess Royal. Captain John D. Kelly.
- Tiger. Captain Arthur A. M. Duff.

== Rear-Admirals commanding ==
Post holders included:

	Rank	Flag	Name	Term	Notes
Rear-Admiral Commanding, 1st Battle Cruiser Squadron
1	Rear-Admiral	Rear-Admiral - Royal Navy	Stanley Colville	24 February 1909 – 24 February 1911	
2	Rear-Admiral	Rear-Admiral - Royal Navy	Lewis Bayly	24 February 1911 – 1 March 1913	
3	Rear-Admiral	Rear-Admiral - Royal Navy	David Beatty	1 March 1913 – February 1915	
4	Rear-Admiral	Rear-Admiral - Royal Navy	Osmond Brock	March 1915 – December 1916	
5	Rear-Admiral	Rear-Admiral - Royal Navy	Richard F. Phillimore	December 1916 – 14 March 1918	
6	Rear-Admiral	Rear-Admiral - Royal Navy	Henry Oliver	14 March 1918 – March 1919	

== Bibliography ==
- Beatty, David (1989). Ranft, Bryan McL. (ed.). The Beatty Papers. Vol. I. London: Navy Records Society. ISBN 978-0-85967-807-0.
- Chalmers, W. S. (1951). The Life and Letters of David, Earl Beatty. London: Hodder and Stoughton.
- Dittmar, F.J.; Colledge, J.J. (1972). British Warships 1914–1919. London: Ian Allan.
- Gordon, Andrew (1996). The Rules of the Game: Jutland and British Naval Command. London: John Murray. ISBN 0-7195-5533-7.
- James, William (1956). The Eyes of the Navy: A Biographical Study of Admiral Sir Reginald Hall. London: Methuen & Co.
- Roberts, John Arthur (2003). Battlecruisers. London: Caxton Editions. ISBN 1-84067-530-6.
