= BL Mark X =

BL Mark X is a breech-loading naval gun and can stand for at least two different types. See:

- BL 9.2 inch gun Mk IX – X
- BL 12 inch Mk X naval gun
