= Naval artillery =

Artillery mounted on a warship

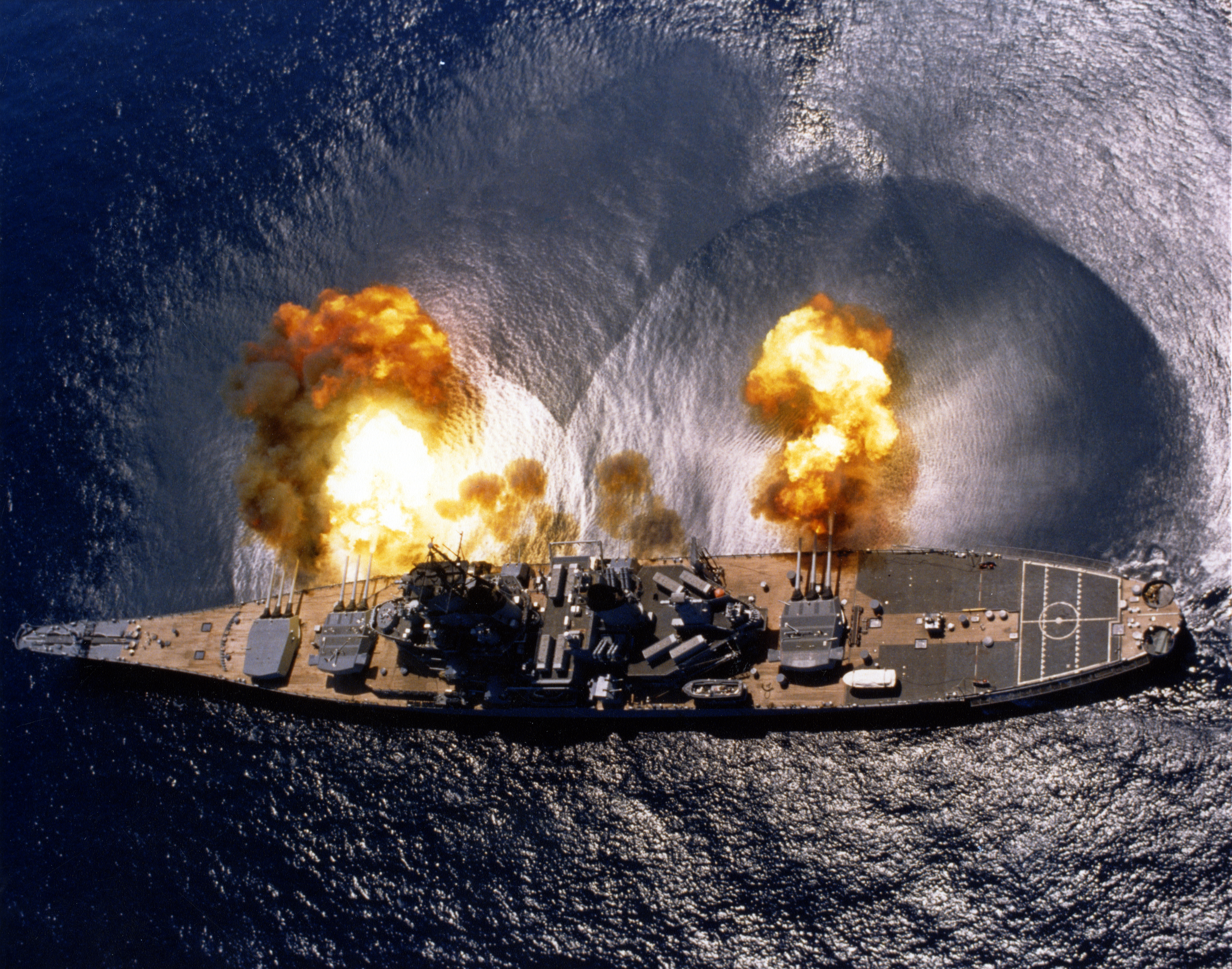
USS Iowa fires a broadside of nine 16"/50 and six 5"/38 guns during an exercise

Naval artillery is artillery mounted on a warship, originally used only for naval warfare and then subsequently used for more specialized roles in surface warfare such as naval gunfire support (NGFS) and anti-aircraft warfare (AAW) engagements. The term generally refers to powder-launched projectile-firing weapons and excludes self-propelled projectiles such as torpedoes, rockets, and missiles and those simply dropped overboard such as depth charges and naval mines.

== Origins ==
The idea of ship-borne artillery dates back to the classical era. Julius Caesar wrote about the Roman navy's usage of ship-borne catapults against Celtic Britons ashore during Caesar's invasions of Britain in his Commentarii de Bello Gallico. The dromons of the Byzantine Empire carried catapults and Greek fire.

From the Middle Ages onwards, warships began to carry cannons of various calibres. In the Battle of Tangdao in 1161, the Southern Song general Li Bao used huopao (a type of gunpowder weapons, possibly cannons) and fire arrows against the Jin dynasty fleets. The Mongol invasion of Java introduced cannons, to be used in Song dynasty naval general warfare (e.g. Cetbang by Majapahit). The Battle of Arnemuiden, fought between England and France in 1338 at the start of the Hundred Years' War, was the first recorded European naval battle using artillery. The English ship Christopher was armed with three cannons and one hand gun. In Asia naval artillery are recorded from the Battle of Lake Poyang in 1363 and in considerable quantities at the Battle of Jinpo in 1380 with cannon made by Ch'oe Mu-sŏn. 80 Koryo warships successfully repelled 500 Japanese pirates referred to as Wokou using long range cannon fire.

By the 15th century, most Mediterranean powers were utilising heavy cannon mounted on the bow or stern of a vessel and designed to bombard fortresses on shore. By mid-century some vessels also carried smaller broadside cannon for bombarding other vessels immediately prior to an attempted boarding. These small guns were anti-personnel weapons and were fired at point blank range to accompany engagement with muskets or bows.

In the 1470s, the Portuguese and Venetian navies were experimenting with ship mounted cannons as anti-ship weapons. King John II of Portugal, while still a prince in 1474, is credited with pioneering the introduction of a reinforced deck on the old Henry-era caravel to allow the mounting of heavy guns for this purpose. These were initially wrought iron breech-loading weapons known as basilisks. In 1489 he further contributed to the development of naval artillery by establishing the first standardized teams of trained naval gunners (bombardeiros).

Use of naval artillery expanded toward the end of the 15th century, with ships purpose-built to carry dozens of small bore breech-loading anti-personnel guns. English examples of these types include Henry VII's Regent and Sovereign, with 141 and 225 guns respectively. Elsewhere in late medieval Northern Europe, the Dutch-built flagship of the Danish-Norwegian King Hans, Gribshunden, carried 68 guns. Eleven gun beds from Gribshunden's artillery have been recovered by archaeologists; all of the guns were small bore swivel guns firing composite lead/iron shot about the size of a golf ball. The remains of at least three more guns are still on that wreck; two of them still have some of the wrought iron barrels and powder chambers evident.

By the early 16th century, the navies of the Mediterranean had universally adopted lighter and more accurate muzzleloaders, cast in bronze and capable of firing balls or stones weighing up to 60 lb (27 kg).

== Age of Sail ==
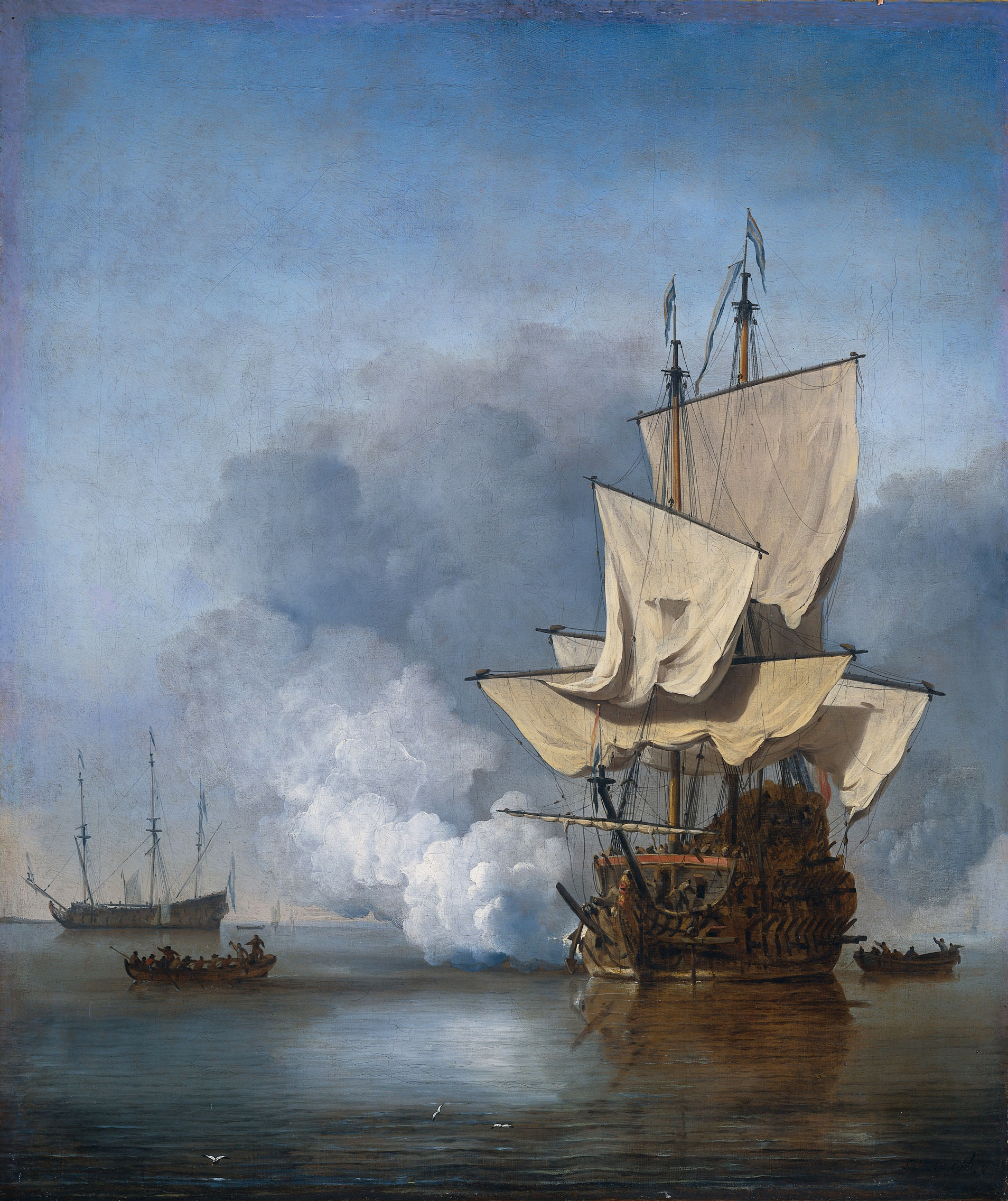
The cannon shot (c. 1680), by Willem van de Velde the Younger

The 16th century was an era of transition in naval warfare. Since ancient times, war at sea had been fought much like that on land: with melee weapons and bows and arrows, but on floating wooden platforms rather than battlefields. Though the introduction of guns was a significant change, it only slowly changed the dynamics of ship-to-ship combat. As guns became heavier and able to take more powerful gunpowder charges, they needed to be placed lower in the ship, closer to the water line.

Heavy artillery on galleys was mounted in the bow, which aligned easily with the long-standing tactical tradition of attacking head on, bow first. The ordnance on galleys was heavy from its introduction in the 1480s, and capable of quickly demolishing the high, thin medieval stone walls that still prevailed in the 16th century. This temporarily upended the strength of older seaside fortresses, which had to be rebuilt to cope with gunpowder weapons. The addition of guns also improved the amphibious abilities of galleys as they could make assaults supported with heavy firepower, and were even more effectively defended when beached stern-first.

=== The broadside ===
Gunports cut in the hull of ships were introduced as early as 1501, about a decade before the famous Tudor era ship, the Mary Rose, was built. This made broadsides, coordinated volleys from all the guns on one side of a ship, possible for the first time in history, at least in theory. (Note: It was not until the 1590s that the word "broadside" in English was commonly used to refer to gunfire from the side of a ship rather than the ship's side itself.)

Ships such as Mary Rose carried a mixture of cannon of different types and sizes, many designed for land use, and using incompatible ammunition at different ranges and rate of fire. Mary Rose, like other ships of the time, was built during a period of rapid development of heavy artillery, and her armament was a mix of old designs and innovations. The heavy armament was a mix of older-type wrought iron and cast bronze guns, which differed considerably in size, range and design. The large iron guns were made up of staves or bars welded into cylinders and then reinforced by shrinking iron hoops and breech loaded, and equipped with simpler gun-carriages made from hollowed-out elm logs with only one pair of wheels, or without wheels entirely. The bronze guns were cast in one piece and rested on four-wheel carriages which were essentially the same as those used until the 19th century. The breech-loaders were cheaper to produce and both easier and faster to reload, but could take less powerful charges than cast bronze guns. Generally, the bronze guns used cast iron shot and were more suited to penetrate hull sides while the iron guns used stone shot that would shatter on impact and leave large, jagged holes, but both could also fire a variety of ammunition intended to destroy rigging and light structure or injure enemy personnel.

The majority of the guns were small iron guns with short range that could be aimed and fired by a single person. The two most common were bases, breech-loading swivel guns, most likely placed in the castles, and hailshot pieces, small muzzle-loaders with rectangular bores and fin-like protrusions that were used to support the guns against the railing and allow the ship structure to take the force of the recoil. Though the design is unknown, there were two top pieces in a 1546 inventory (finished after the sinking) which was probably similar to a base, but placed in one or more of the fighting tops.

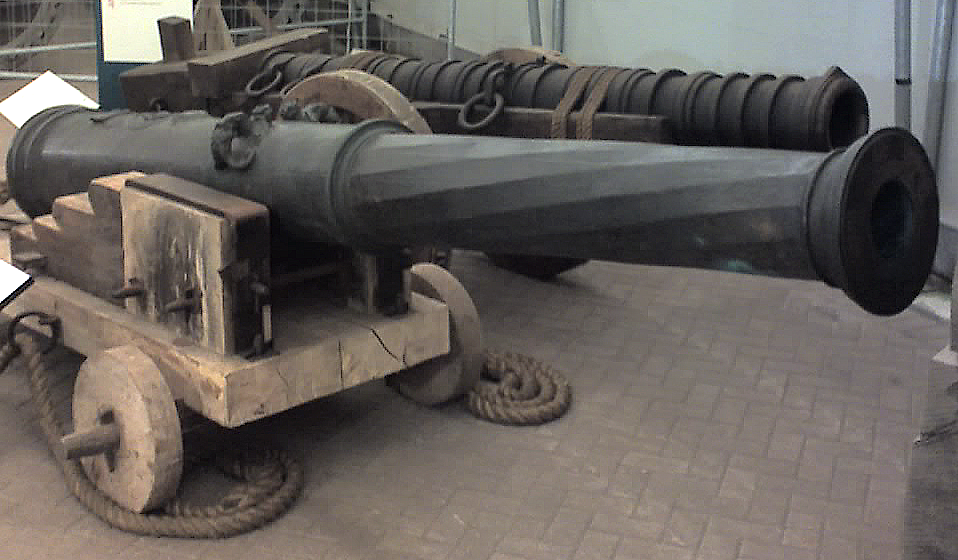
A cast bronze culverin (front) and a wrought iron port piece (back), modern reproductions of two of the guns that were on board the Mary Rose when she sank, on display at Fort Nelson near Portsmouth

During rebuilding in 1536, Mary Rose had a second tier of carriage-mounted long guns fitted. Records show how the configuration of guns changed as gun-making technology evolved and new classifications were invented. In 1514, the armament consisted mostly of anti-personnel guns like the larger breech-loading iron murderers and the small serpentines, demi-slings and stone guns. Only a handful of guns in the first inventory were powerful enough to hole enemy ships, and most would have been supported by the ship's structure rather than resting on carriages. The inventories of both the Mary Rose and the Tower had changed radically by 1540. There were now the new cast bronze cannons, demi-cannons, culverins and sakers and the wrought iron port pieces (a name that indicated they fired through ports), all of which required carriages, had longer range and were capable of doing serious damage to other ships.

Various types of ammunition could be used for different purposes: plain spherical shot of stone or iron smashed hulls, spiked bar shot and shot linked with chains would tear sails or damage rigging, and canister shot packed with sharp flints produced a devastating shotgun effect. Trials made with replicas of culverins and port pieces showed that they could penetrate wood the same thickness of the Mary Rose's hull planking, indicating a stand-off range of at least 90 m (100 yd). The port pieces proved particularly efficient at smashing large holes in wood when firing stone shot and were a devastating anti-personnel weapon when loaded with flakes or pebbles.

A perrier threw a stone projectile about 1,200 metres (3/4 miles), while a cannon threw a 32-pound ball 1,600 metres (a full mile), and a culverin a 17-pound ball 2 kilometres (1 1/4 miles). Swivel guns and smaller cannon were often loaded with grapeshot for antipersonnel use at closer ranges, while the larger cannon might be loaded with a single heavy cannonball to cause structural damage.

In Portugal, the development of the heavy galleon removed even the necessity of bringing carrack firepower to bear in most circumstances. One of them became famous in the conquest of Tunis in 1535, and could carry 366 bronze cannon (a possible exaggeration of the various European chroniclers of the time, that reported this number; or also possibly counting the weapons in reserve). This ship had an exceptional capacity of fire for its time, illustrating the evolution that was operating at the time, and for this reason, it became known as Botafogo, meaning literally 'fire maker', 'torcher', or 'spitfire' in popular Portuguese.

=== Maturation ===
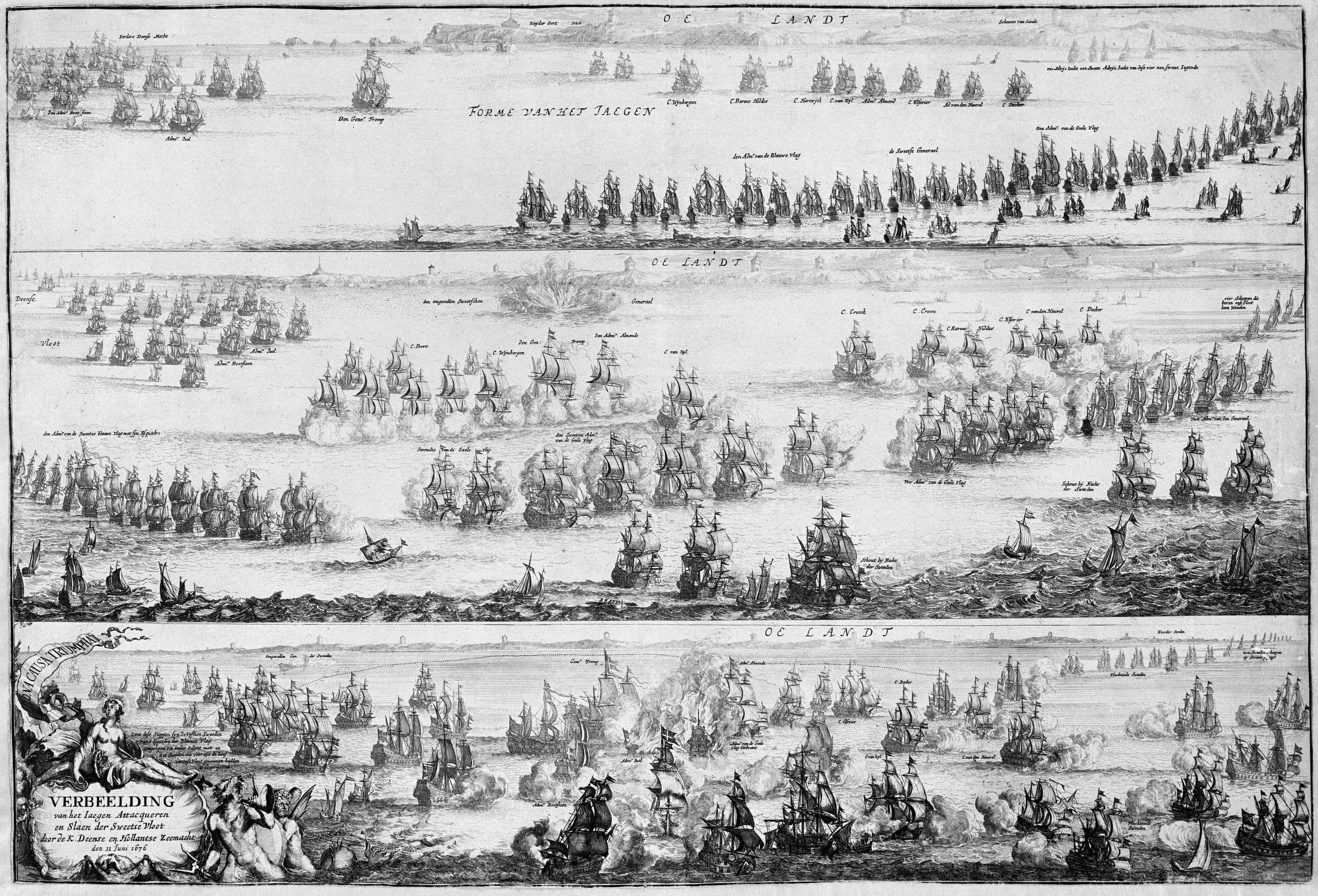
The line of battle was used from the beginning of the 16th century by the Portuguese, especially in the Indian Ocean, and from the 17th century, by the other Europeans in general, beginning with the Dutch and the English, in the English Channel and the North Sea. Pictured, the Battle of Öland between an allied Danish–Dutch fleet under Cornelis Tromp and the Swedish navy.

Naval artillery and tactics stayed relatively constant during the period 1571–1862, with large, sail-powered wooden naval warships mounting a great variety of different types and sizes of cannon as their main armament.

By the 1650s, the line of battle had developed as a tactic that could take advantage of the broadside armament. This method became the heart of naval warfare during the Age of Sail, with navies adapting their strategies and tactics in order to get the most broadside-on fire. Cannon were mounted on multiple decks to maximise broadside effectiveness. Numbers and calibre differed somewhat with preferred tactics. France and Spain attempted to immobilize ships by destroying rigging with long-range, accurate fire from their swifter and more maneuverable ships, while England and the Dutch Republic favoured rapid fire at close range to shatter a ship's hull and disable its crew.

A typical broadside of a Royal Navy ship of the late 18th century could be fired two or three times in approximately 5 minutes, depending on the training of the crew, a well trained one being essential to the simple yet detailed process of preparing to fire. French and Spanish crews typically took twice as long to fire an aimed broadside. An 18th-century ship of the line typically mounted 32-pounder or 36-pounder long guns on a lower deck, and 18- or 24-pounders on an upper deck, with some 12-pounders on the forecastle and quarterdeck. From the late sixteenth century it was routine for naval ships to carry a master gunner, responsible for overseeing the operation of the cannon on board. Originally a prestigious position, its status declined throughout the Age of Sail as responsibility for gunnery strategy was devolved to midshipmen or lieutenants. By the eighteenth century the master gunner had become responsible only for the maintenance of the guns and their carriages, and for overseeing supplies of gunpowder and shot. In status the master gunner remained equal to the boatswain and ship's carpenter as senior warrant officers, and was entitled to the support of one or more gunner's mates. In the Royal Navy, the master gunner also directed the "quarter gunners", able seamen with the added responsibility of managing the rate and direction of fire from any set of four gun crews.

The British Admiralty did not see fit to provide additional powder to captains to train their crews, generally only allowing one-third of the powder loaded onto the ship to be fired in the first six months of a typical voyage, barring hostile action. Instead of live fire practice, most captains exercised their crews by "running" the guns in and outperforming all the steps associated with firing but for the actual discharge. Some wealthy captains – those who had made money capturing prizes or from wealthy families – were known to purchase powder with their own funds to enable their crews to fire real discharges at real targets.

==== Firing ====
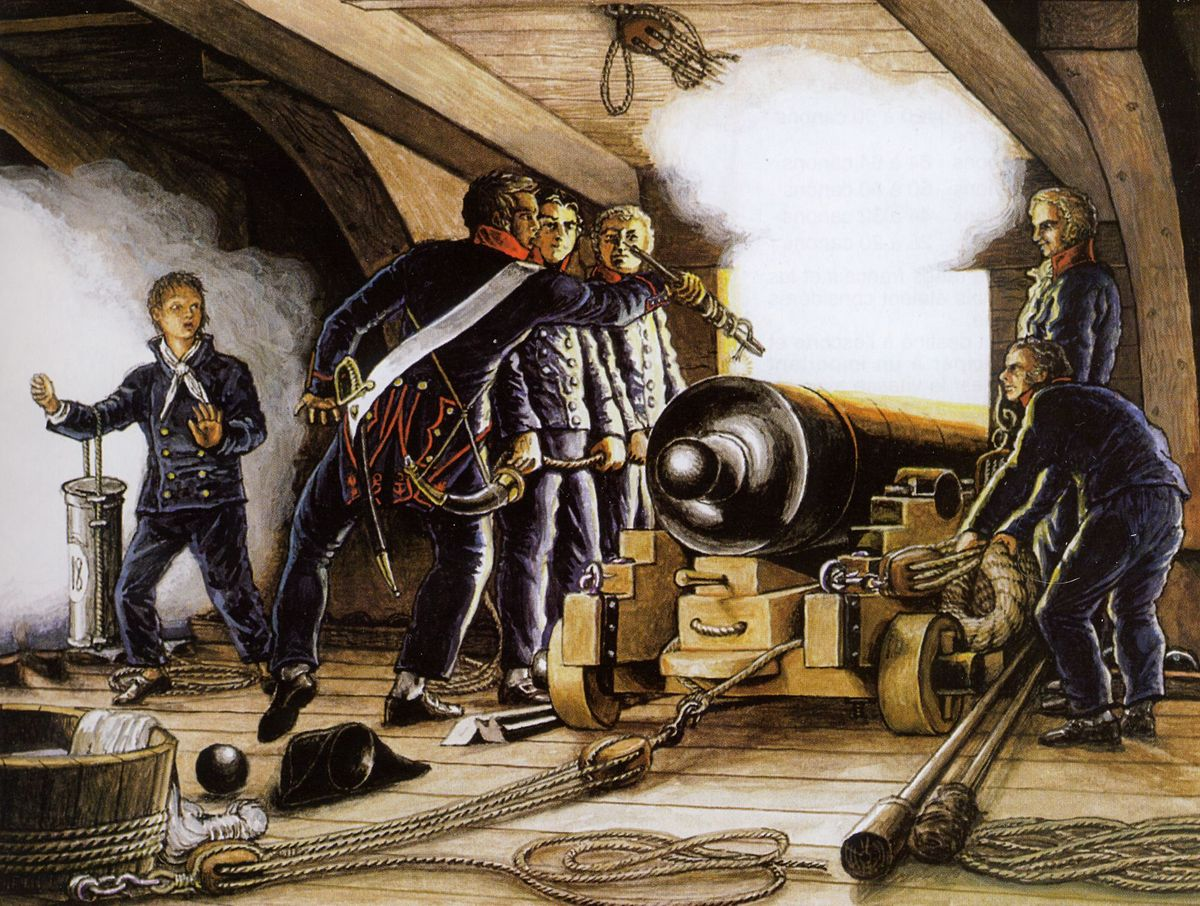
Firing of an 18-pounder aboard a French ship

Firing a naval cannon required a great amount of labour and manpower. The propellant was gunpowder, whose bulk had to be kept in a special storage area below deck for safety. Powder boys (sometimes called powder monkeys), typically 10–14 years old, were enlisted to run powder from the armoury up to the gun decks of a vessel as required.

A typical firing procedure follows. A wet swab was used to mop out the interior of the barrel, extinguishing any embers from a previous firing which might set off the next charge of gunpowder prematurely. Gunpowder, either loose or in a cloth or parchment cartridge pierced by a metal pricker through the touch hole, was placed in the barrel and followed by a cloth wad (typically made from canvas and old rope), then rammed home with a rammer. Next the shot was rammed in, followed by another wad (to prevent the cannonball from rolling out of the barrel if the muzzle was depressed.) The gun in its carriage was then run out – men heaved on the gun tackles until the front of the gun carriage was hard up against the ship's bulwark, and the barrel protruding out of the gun port. This took the majority of the guncrew manpower as the total weight of a large cannon in its carriage could reach over two tons, and the ship would probably be rolling.

The touch hole in the rear (breech) of the cannon was primed with finer gunpowder (priming powder), or a quill (from a porcupine or such, or the skin-end of a feather) pre-filled with priming powder, then ignited.

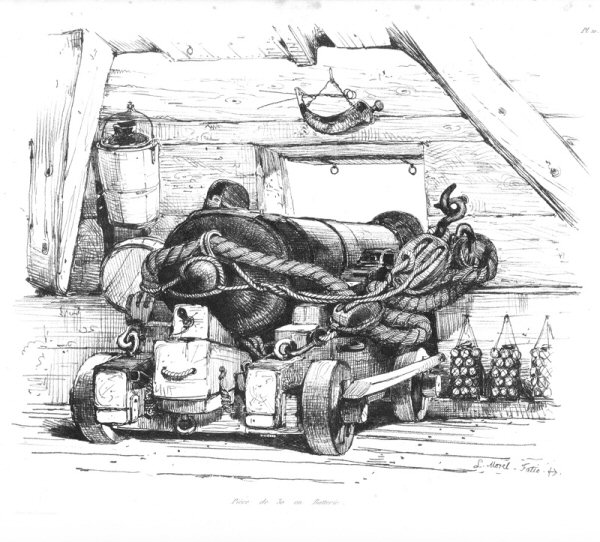
36-pounder long gun at the ready. The pointing system and accessories can be seen clearly.

The earlier method of firing a cannon was to apply a linstock – a wooden staff holding a length of smoldering match at the end—to the touch-hole of the gun. This was dangerous and made accurate shooting from a moving ship difficult, as the gun had to be fired from the side, to avoid its recoil, and there was a noticeable delay between the application of the linstock and the gun firing. In 1745, the British began using gunlocks (flintlock mechanisms fitted to cannon).

The gunlock was operated by pulling a cord, or lanyard. The gun-captain could stand behind the gun, safely beyond its range of recoil, and sight along the barrel, firing when the roll of the ship lined the gun up with the enemy and so avoid the chance of the shot hitting the sea or flying high over the enemy's deck. Despite their advantages, gunlocks spread gradually as they could not be retrofitted to older guns. The British adopted them faster than the French, who had still not generally adopted them by the time of the Battle of Trafalgar in 1805, placing them at a disadvantage as they were in general use by the Royal Navy at this time. After the introduction of gunlocks, linstocks were retained, but only as a backup means of firing.

The linstock slow match, or the spark from the flintlock, ignited the priming powder, which in turn set off the main charge, which propelled the shot out of the barrel. When the gun discharged, the recoil sent it backwards until it was stopped by the breech rope – a sturdy rope made fast to ring bolts set into the bulwarks, and a turn taken about the gun's cascabel, the knob at the end of the gun barrel.

==== Artillery and shot ====
The types of artillery used varied from nation and time period. The more important types included the demi-cannon, the culverin and demi-culverin, and the carronade. One descriptive characteristic which was commonly used was to define guns by their 'pound' rating: theoretically, the weight of a single solid iron shot fired by that bore of cannon. Common sizes were 42-pounders, 36-pounders, 32-pounders, 24-pounders, 18-pounders, 12-pounders, 9-pounders, 8-pounders, 6-pounders, and various smaller calibres. French ships used standardized guns of 36-pound, 24-pound, and 12-pound calibres, augmented by smaller pieces. In general, larger ships carrying more guns carried larger ones as well.

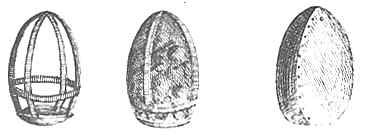
Examples of canister shot.

The muzzle-loading design and weight of the iron placed design constraints on the length and size of naval guns. Muzzle loading required the cannon muzzle to be positioned within the hull of the ship for loading. The hull is only so wide, with guns on both sides, and hatchways in the centre of the deck also limit the room available. Weight is always a great concern in ship design as it affects speed, stability, and buoyancy. The desire for longer guns for greater range and accuracy, and greater weight of shot for more destructive power, led to some interesting gun designs.

One unique naval gun was the long nine. It was a proportionately longer-barrelled 9-pounder. Its typical mounting as a bow or stern chaser, where it was not perpendicular to the keel, allowed room to operate this longer weapon. In a chase situation, the gun's greater range came into play. However, the desire to reduce weight in the ends of the ship and the relative fragility of the bow and stern portions of the hull limited this role to a 9-pounder, rather than one which used a 12- or 24-pound shot.

In the reign of Queen Elizabeth advances in manufacturing technology allowed the English Navy Royal to start using matched cannon firing standard ammunition, allowing firing of coordinated broadsides (although that was more of a matter of improved training and discipline than of matched guns).

Different types of shot were employed for various situations. Standard fare was the round shot, which is spherical cast-iron shot used for smashing through the enemy's hull, holing his waterline, smashing gun carriages and breaking masts and yards, with a secondary effect of sending large wooden splinters flying about to maim and kill the enemy crew. At very close range, two round shots could be loaded in one gun and fired together. Double-shotting, as it was called, lowered the effective range and accuracy of the gun, but could be devastating within pistol shot range.

Canister shot consisted of metallic canisters which broke open upon firing, each of which was filled with hundreds of lead musket balls for clearing decks like a giant shotgun blast; it is commonly mistakenly called grapeshot, both today and in historic accounts (typically those of landsmen). Although canister shot could be used aboard ship, it was more traditionally an army artillery projectile for clearing fields of infantry. Grapeshot was similar in that it also consisted of multiple (usually 9–12) projectiles that separated upon firing, except that the shot was larger (at least 2.5 centimetres [1 inch] in diameter, up to 7.6 cm [3 in] or larger for heavier guns), and it either came in bundles held together by lengths of rope wrapped around the balls and wedged between, with wooden bases to act as wadding when rammed down the muzzles, or in canvas sacks wrapped about with rope. The name "grapeshot" comes from the former's apparent resemblance to a bunch of grapes. When fired, the inertial forces would cause the bundle to disintegrate, and the shot would spread out to hit numerous targets. Grapeshot was a naval weapon, and existed for almost as long as naval artillery. The larger size of the grapeshot projectiles was desirable because it was more capable of cutting thick cordage and smashing equipment than the relatively smaller musket balls of a canister shot, although it could rarely penetrate a wooden hull. Although grapeshot won great popular fame as a weapon used against enemy crew on open decks (especially when massed in great numbers, such as for a boarding attempt), it was originally designed and carried primarily for cutting up enemy rigging.

A more specialized shot for similar use was the chain-shot, which consisted of two iron balls joined together with a chain, and was particularly designed for cutting large swaths of rigging, such as boarding nets and sails. It was far more effective than other projectiles in this use, but was of little use for any other purpose. Bar shot was similar, except that it used a solid bar to join the two balls; the bar could sometimes also extend upon firing. Series of long chain links were also used in a similar way. Bags of junk, such as scrap metal, bolts, rocks, gravel, or old musket balls, were known as langrage, and were fired to injure enemy crews (although this was not common, and when it was used, it was generally aboard non-commissioned vessels such as privateers, actual pirate ships, merchantmen, and others who couldn't afford real ammunition).

In China and other parts of Asia, fire arrows were thick, dartlike, rocket-propelled incendiary projectiles with barbed points, wrapped with pitch-soaked canvas which took fire when the rocket was launched, which could either be from special launching racks or from a cannon barrel. The point stuck in sails, hulls or spars and set fire to the enemy ship. In Western naval warfare, shore forts sometimes heated iron shot red-hot in a special furnace before loading it (with water-soaked wads to prevent it from setting off the powder charge prematurely.) The hot shot lodging in a ship's dry timbers would set the ship afire. Because of the danger of fire aboard (and the difficulty of heating and transporting the red-hot shot aboard ship), heated shot was seldom used from ship-mounted cannon, as the danger to the vessel deploying it was almost as great as to the enemy; fire was the single greatest fear of all men sailing in wooden ships. Consequently, for men aboard these vessels, going up against shore artillery firing heated shot was a terrifying experience, and typically wooden fleets were not expected to brave such fire except in cases of great emergency, as a single heated shot could easily destroy the entire ship and crew, while the same ship could typically be expected to survive numerous hits from normal solid shot.

=== Bomb ketch ===
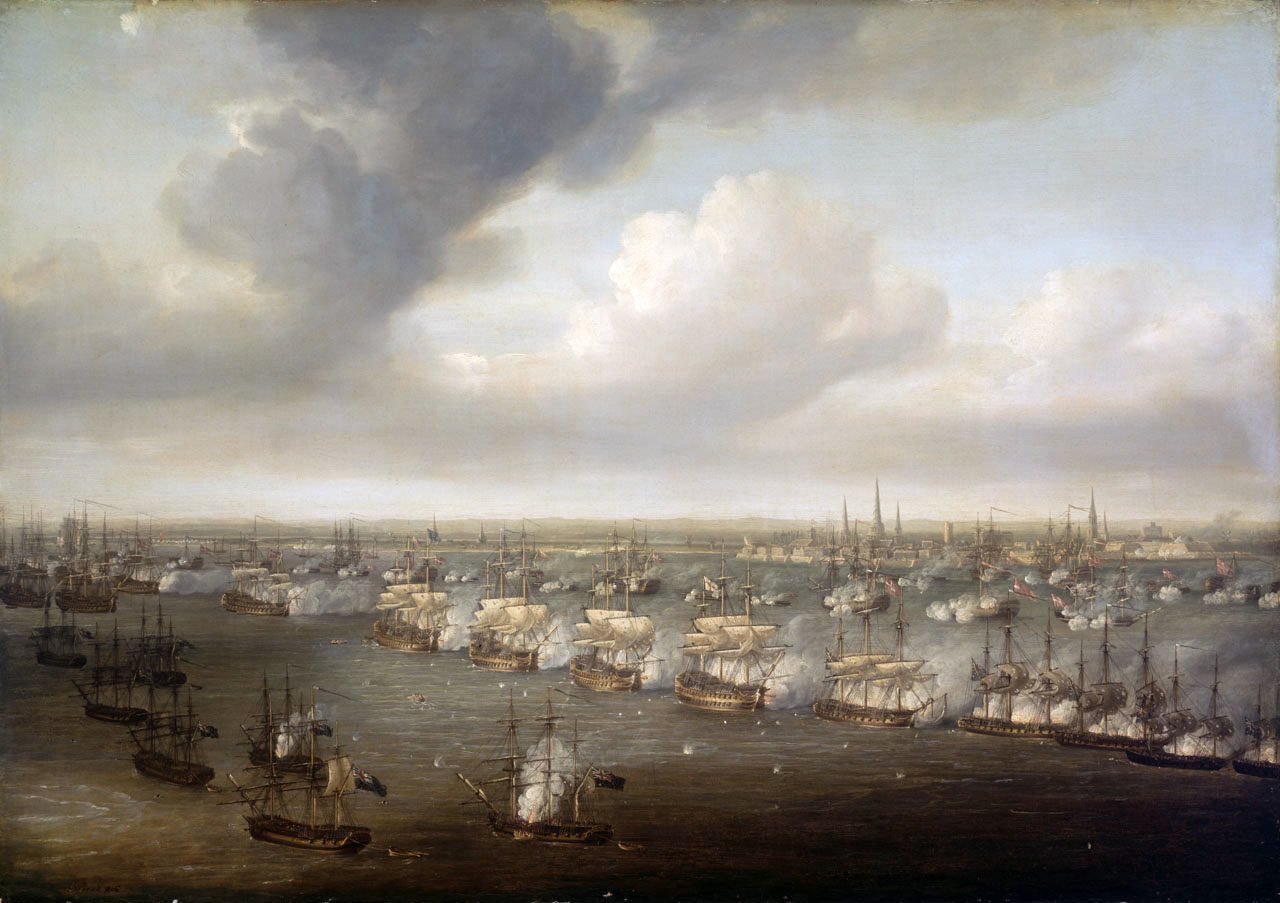
In this view of the Battle of Copenhagen (1801), bomb vessels in the left foreground fire over the British and Danish lines of battle into the city in the background

The bomb ketch was developed as a wooden sailing naval ship with its primary armament as mortars mounted forward near the bow and elevated to a high angle, and projecting their fire in a ballistic arc. Explosive shells or carcasses were employed rather than solid shot. Bomb vessels were specialized ships designed for bombarding (hence the name) fixed positions on land.

The first recorded deployment of bomb vessels by the English was for the Siege of Calais in 1347 when Edward III deployed single deck ships with Bombardes and other artillery.

The first specialised bomb vessels were built towards the end of the 17th century, based on the designs of Bernard Renau d'Eliçagaray, and used by the French Navy. Five such vessels were used to shell Algiers in 1682 destroying the land forts, and killing some 700 defenders. Two years later the French repeated their success at Genoa. The early French bomb vessels had two forward-pointing mortars fixed side-by-side on the foredeck. To aim these weapons, the entire ship was rotated by letting out or pulling in a spring anchor. The range was usually controlled by adjusting the gunpowder charge.

The Royal Navy continued to refine the class over the next century or more, after Huguenot exiles brought designs over to England and the United Provinces. The side-by-side, forward-pointing mortars were replaced in the British designs by mortars mounted on the centerline on revolving platforms. These platforms were supported by strong internal wooden framework to transmit the forces of firing the weapons to the hull. The interstices of the framework were used as storage areas for ammunition. Early bomb vessels were rigged as ketches with two masts. They were awkward vessels to handle, in part because bomb ketches typically had the masts stepped farther aft than would have been normal in other vessels of similar rig, in order to accommodate the mortars forward and provide a clear area for their forward fire. As a result, the 19th century British bomb vessels were designed as full-rigged ships with three masts, and two mortars, one between each neighboring pair of masts.

=== Scientific gunnery ===
New Principles in Gunnery by Benjamin Robins put the art of gunnery onto a scientific basis

The art of gunnery was put on a scientific basis in the mid-18th century. British military engineer Benjamin Robins used Newtonian mechanics to calculate the projectile trajectory while taking the air resistance into account. He also carried out an extensive series of experiments in gunnery, embodying his results in his famous treatise on gunnery New Principles in Gunnery (1742), which contains a description of his ballistic pendulum.

Robins also made a number of important experiments on the resistance of the air to the motion of projectiles, and on the force of gunpowder, with computation of the velocities thereby communicated to projectiles. He compared the results of his theory with experimental determinations of the ranges of mortars and cannon, and gave practical maxims for the management of artillery. He also made observations on the flight of rockets and wrote on the advantages of rifled gun barrels.

Robins argued for the use of larger bore cannon and the importance of tightly fitting cannonballs. His work on gunnery was translated into German by Leonhard Euler and was heavily influential on the development of naval weaponry across Europe.

Another significant scientific gunnery book was written by Warrant Officer George Marshall, a Master Gunner in the United Navy. He wrote Marshall's Practical Marine Gunnery in 1822. The book discusses the dimensions and apparatus necessary for the equipment of naval artillery. The book goes into further details regarding the distance of a shot on a ship based on the sound of the gun, which was found to fly at a rate of 348 metres (1,142 feet; 381 yards) in one second. According to Marshall's equation after seeing the flash of a cannon and hearing the blast the gunner would count the seconds until impact. This way a trained ear would know the distance a cannonball traveled and might gain information or return fire. The book example, outlines a 9-second scenario where the distance the cannon was fired from the gunner was approximately 3,133 metres (10,278 feet; 3,426 yards).

=== Technical innovations ===
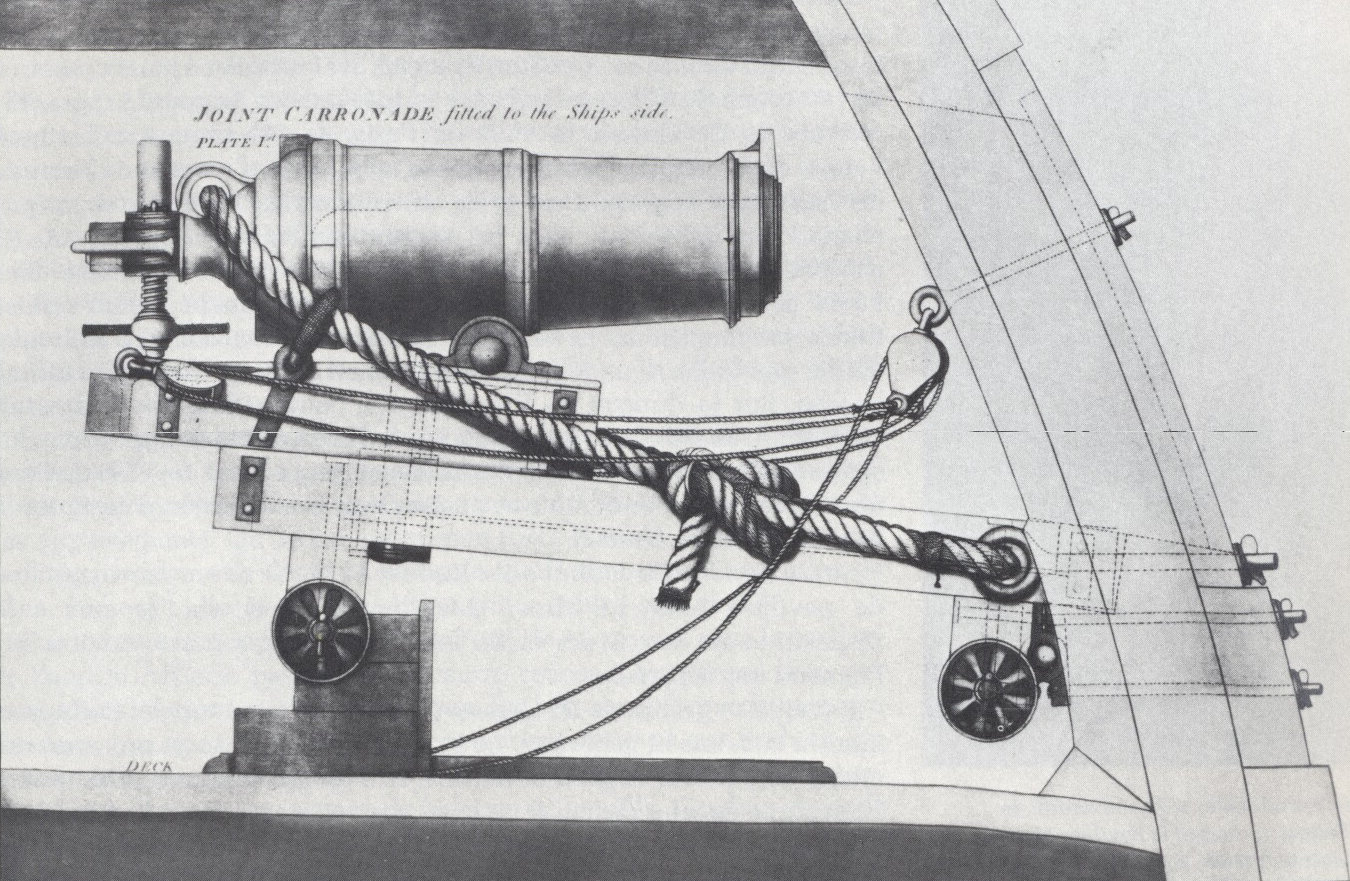
The carronade was a small gun, devastating at short range

By the outbreak of the French Revolutionary Wars in 1793, a series of technical innovations over the course of the late 18th century combined to give the British fleet a distinct superiority over the ships of the French and Spanish navies.

The carronade was a short-barrelled gun which threw a heavy ball developed by the Carron Company, a Scottish ironworks, in 1778. Because of irregularities in the size of cannonballs and the difficulty of boring out gun barrels, there was usually a considerable gap between the ball and the bore – often as much as 6 mm (1/4 inch) – with a consequent loss of efficiency. This gap was known as the windage. The manufacturing practices introduced by the Carron Company reduced the windage considerably, enabling the ball to be fired with less powder and hence a smaller and lighter gun. The carronade was half the weight of an equivalent long gun, but could throw a heavy ball over a limited distance. The light weight of the carronade meant that the guns could be added to the forecastle and quarterdeck of frigates and ships of the line, increasing firepower without affecting the ship's sailing qualities. It became known as the "Smasher" and gave ships armed with carronades a great advantage at short range. The mounting, attached to the side of the ship on a pivot, took the recoil on a slider. The reduced recoil did not alter the alignment of the gun. The smaller gunpowder charge reduced the guns' heating in action. The pamphlet advocated the use of woollen cartridges, which, although more expensive, eliminated the need for wadding and worming. Simplifying gunnery for comparatively untrained merchant seamen in both aim and reloading was part of the rationale for the gun. The replacement of trunnions by a bolt underneath, to connect the gun to the mounting, reduced the width of the carriage enhancing the wide angle of fire. A carronade weighed one-quarter as much and used one-quarter to one-third of the gunpowder charge for a long gun firing the same cannonball. Its invention is variously ascribed to Lieutenant General Robert Melville in 1759, or to Charles Gascoigne, manager of the Carron Company from 1769 to 1779. Carronades initially became popular on British merchant ships during the American Revolutionary War. A lightweight gun that needed only a small gun crew and was devastating at short range was a weapon well suited to defending merchant ships against French and American privateers. In the Action of 4 September 1782, the impact of a single carronade broadside fired at close range by the frigate HMS Rainbow under Henry Trollope caused a wounded French captain to capitulate and surrender the Hébé after a short fight.

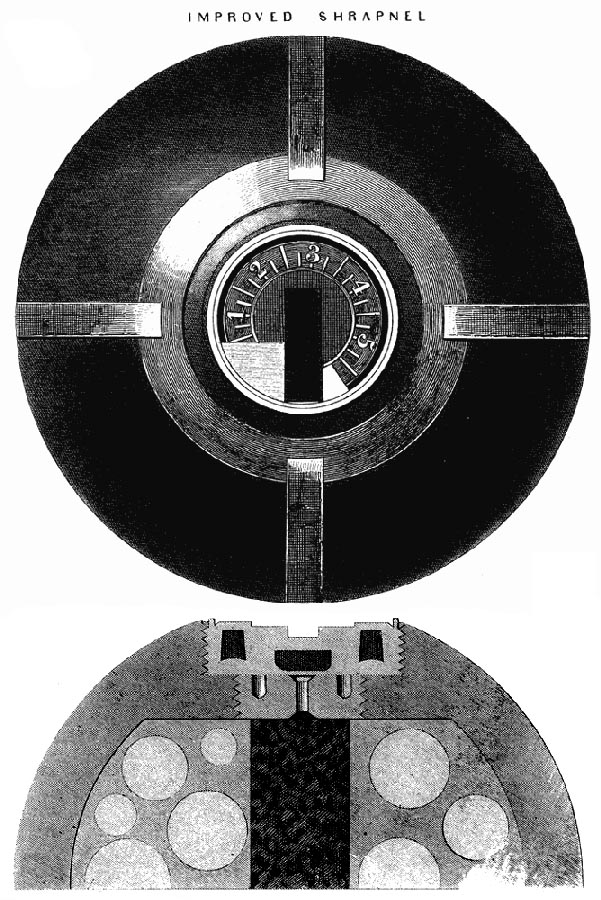
A 12-pounder US shrapnel shell c. 1865

Flintlock firing mechanisms for cannon were suggested by Captain Sir Charles Douglas and introduced during the American War of Independence in place of the traditional matches. Flintlocks enabled a higher rate of fire and greater accuracy as the gun captain could choose the exact moment of firing. Prior to this the Royal Navy introduced the use of goose quills filled with powder during the Seven Years' War giving an almost instantaneous burn time compared with earlier methods of detonation.

Douglas also innovated a system that greatly increased the field of fire. By the simple expedient of attaching the gun ropes at a greater distance from the gunports, the range through which each cannon could be traversed was greatly improved. The new system was first tested at the Battle of the Saintes in 1782, where HMS Duke, Formidable, and Arrogant, and perhaps other British ships, had adopted Douglas's new system.

The shrapnel shell was developed in 1784, by Major General Henry Shrapnel of the Royal Artillery. Canister shot was already in widespread use at the time; a tin or canvas container filled with small iron or lead balls burst open when fired, giving the effect of an oversized shotgun shell. Shrapnel's innovation was to combine the multi-projectile shotgun effect of canister shot, with a time fuze to open the canister and disperse the bullets it contained at some distance along the canister's trajectory from the gun. His shell was a hollow cast-iron sphere filled with a mixture of balls and powder, with a crude time fuze. If the fuze was set correctly then the shell would break open, either in front or above the intended target, releasing its contents (of musket balls). The shrapnel balls would carry on with the "remaining velocity" of the shell. In addition to a denser pattern of musket balls, the retained velocity could be higher as well, since the shrapnel shell as a whole would likely have a higher ballistic coefficient than the individual musket balls.

== Industrial era and the Age of Steamships ==
The Industrial Revolution introduced steam-powered ironclad warships seemingly impervious to cast cannon. The inadequacy of naval artillery caused the naval ram to reappear as a means of sinking armored warships. The rapidity of innovation through the last half of the 19th century caused some ships to be obsolete before they were launched. Maximum projectile velocity obtainable with gunpowder in cast cannon was approximately 480 m/s (1,600 ft/s). Increased projectile weight through increased caliber was the only method of improving armor penetration with this velocity limitation. Some ironclads carried extremely heavy, slow-firing guns of calibres up to 16.25 inches (41.3 cm). These guns were the only weapons capable of piercing the ever-thicker iron armour on the later ironclads, but required steam powered machinery to assist loading cannonballs too heavy for men to lift.

=== Explosive shells ===
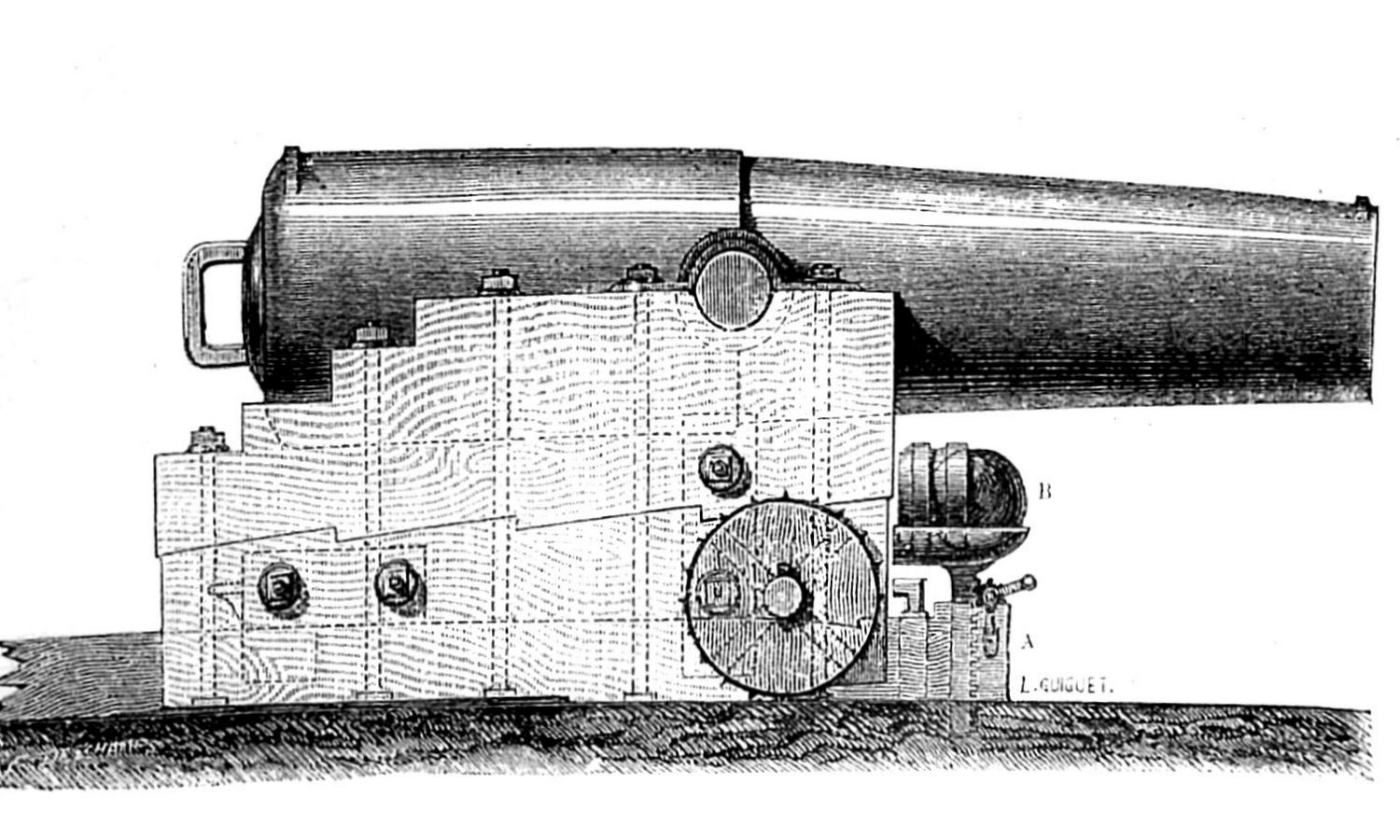
The Paixhans gun was a naval gun which fired shells.

Explosive shells had long been in use in ground warfare (in howitzers and mortars), but they were only fired at high angles and with relatively low velocities. Shells are inherently dangerous to handle, and no solution had been found to combine the explosive character of the shells with the high power and flatter trajectory of a high velocity gun.

However, high trajectories were not practical for marine combat and naval combat essentially required flat-trajectory guns in order to have some decent odds of hitting the target. Therefore, naval warfare had consisted for centuries of encounters between flat-trajectory cannon using inert cannonballs, which could inflict only local damage even on wooden hulls.

The first naval gun designed to fire explosive shells was the Paixhans gun, developed by the French general Henri-Joseph Paixhans in 1822–1823. He advocated using flat-trajectory shell guns against warships in 1822 in his Nouvelle force maritime et artillerie, and developed a delaying mechanism which, for the first time, allowed shells to be fired safely in high-powered flat-trajectory guns. The effect of explosive shells lodging into wooden hulls and then detonating was potentially devastating. This was first demonstrated by Henri-Joseph Paixhans in trials against the two-decker Pacificateur in 1824, in which he successfully broke up the ship. Two prototype Paixhans guns had been cast in 1823 and 1824 for this test. Paixhans reported the results in Experiences faites sur une arme nouvelle. The shells were equipped with a fuse which ignited automatically when the gun was fired. The shell would then lodge itself in the wooden hull of the target before exploding a moment later.

The first Paixhans guns for the French Navy were manufactured in 1841. The barrel of the guns weighed about 10,000 lbs. (4.5 metric tons), and proved accurate to about two miles. In the 1840s, Britain, Russia and the United States adopted the new naval guns. The effect of the guns in an operational context was decisively demonstrated during the Crimean War. The incendiary properties of exploding shells demonstrated the obsolescence of wooden warships in the 1853 Battle of Sinop; but detonation effectiveness was limited by use of gunpowder bursting charges. Early high explosives used in torpedo warheads would detonate during the acceleration of firing from a gun. After brief use of dynamite guns aboard USS Vesuvius, picric acid became widely used in conventional naval artillery shells during the 1890s.

=== Breech-loading, rifled artillery ===
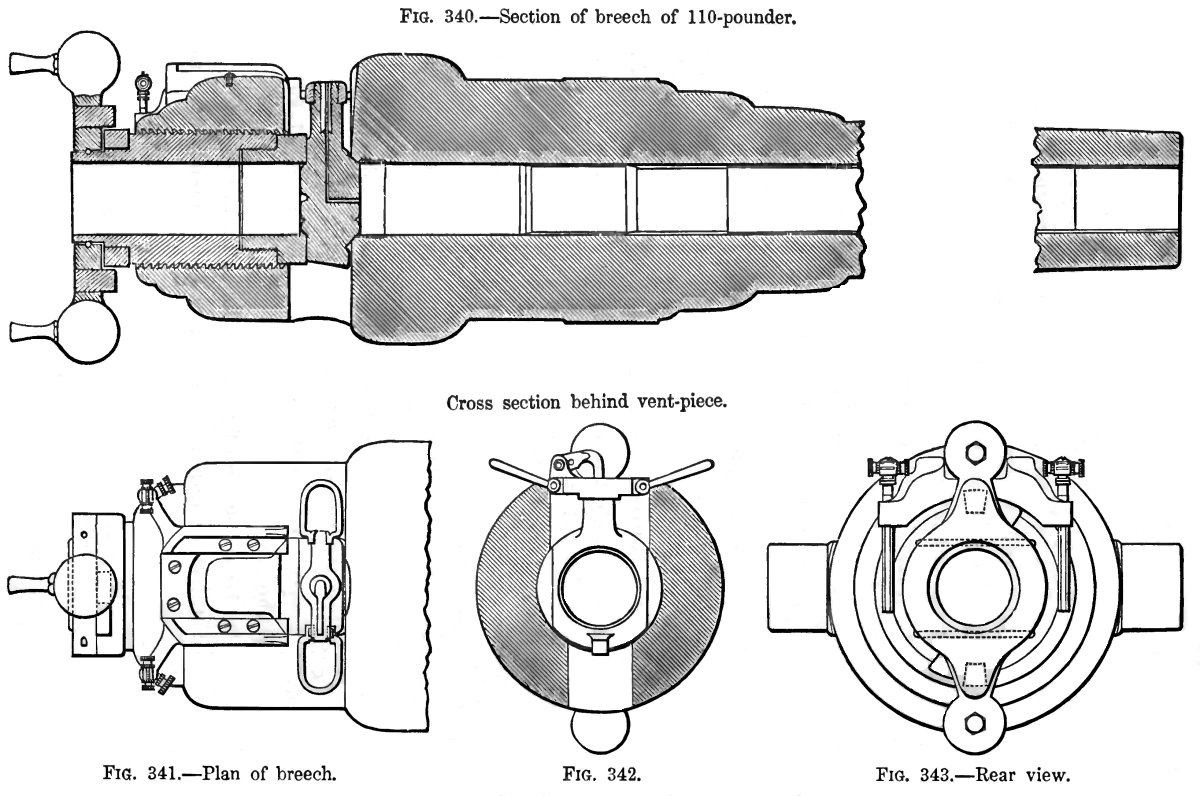
Screw breech system of 7-inch Armstrong gun

William Armstrong was awarded a contract by the British government in the 1850s to design a revolutionary new piece of artillery—the Armstrong Gun—produced at the Elswick Ordnance Company. This marked the birth of modern artillery both on land and at sea. The piece was rifled, which allowed for a much more accurate and powerful action. The necessary machinery to accurately rifle artillery was only available by the mid-19th century. The cast iron shell fired by the Armstrong gun was similar in shape to a Minié ball and had a thin lead coating which made it fractionally larger than the gun's bore and which engaged with the gun's rifling grooves to impart spin to the shell. This spin, together with the elimination of windage as a result of the tight fit, enabled the gun to achieve greater range and accuracy than existing smooth-bore muzzle-loaders with a smaller powder charge.

His gun was also a breech-loader. Although attempts at breech-loading mechanisms had been made since medieval times, the essential engineering problem was that the mechanism couldn't withstand the explosive charge. It was only with the advances in metallurgy and precision engineering capabilities during the Industrial Revolution that Armstrong was able to construct a viable solution. The gun combined all the properties that make up an effective artillery piece. The gun was mounted on a carriage in such a way as to return the gun to firing position after the recoil.

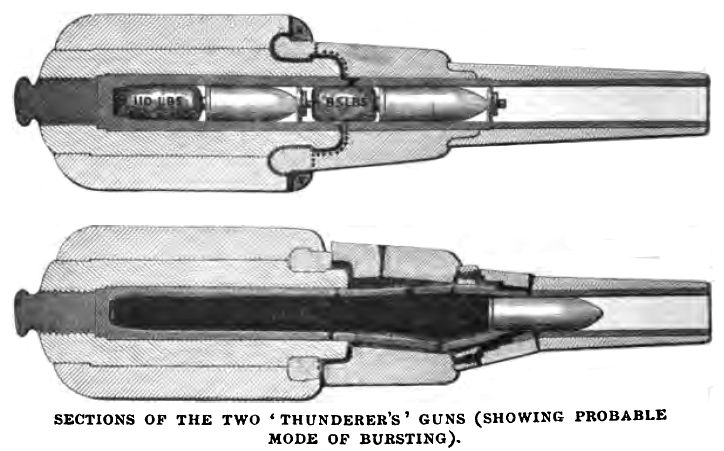
Diagram showing how the muzzle-loading gun on HMS Thunderer burst in 1879

What made the gun really revolutionary lay in the technique of the construction of the gun barrel that allowed it to withstand much more powerful explosive forces. The "built-up" method involved assembling the barrel with wrought-iron (later mild steel was used) tubes of successively larger diameter. The next tube would be heated to allow it to expand and fit over the previous tube. When it cooled the tube would contract to a slightly smaller diameter, which allowed an even pressure along the walls of the gun which was directed inward against the outward forces that the gun firing exerted on the barrel. (Note: Holley states that Daniel Treadwell first patented the concept of a central steel tube kept under compression by wrought-iron coils and that Armstrong's assertion that he (Armstrong) first used a wrought-iron A-tube and hence did not infringe the patent, was disingenuous, as the main point in Treadwell's patent was the tension exerted by the wrought-iron coils, which Armstrong used in exactly the same fashion.) Built-up guns with rifling made cast cannon obsolete by 1880.

Armstrong's system was adopted in 1858, initially for "special service in the field" and initially he only produced smaller artillery pieces, 6-pounder (2.5 in/64 mm) mountain or light field guns, 9-pounder (3 in/76 mm) guns for horse artillery, and 12-pounder (3 inches /76 mm) field guns.

However, despite the gun's advantages, an 1863 British Ordnance Select committee decided to revert to muzzle-loading artillery pieces on the grounds of cost and efficiency.

Large-caliber breech-loading naval artillery became practical with French development of the interrupted screw obturator by Charles Ragon de Bange in 1872. It was only after a serious accident on board HMS Thunderer in 1879 when the left muzzleloading 12-inch (305 mm) gun in the forward turret exploded during practice firing in the Sea of Marmora killing 11 and injuring a further 35, that the Royal Navy decisively changed to breech loading guns. Improved loading and handling procedures were also adopted, and Thunderer herself was re-equipped with long-calibre 10" breech-loaders. Breech loading artillery overcame barrel length limitations of cast cannon imposed by the necessity of retracting the cannon into the hull for reloading through the muzzle. Simultaneous availability of longer barrels and slower burning brown powder increased projectile velocities to 650 m/s (2,100 ft/s). Spin-stabilized elongated projectiles offered both reliable positioning of percussion fuzes and improved armor penetration through increased sectional density.

=== Gun turrets ===
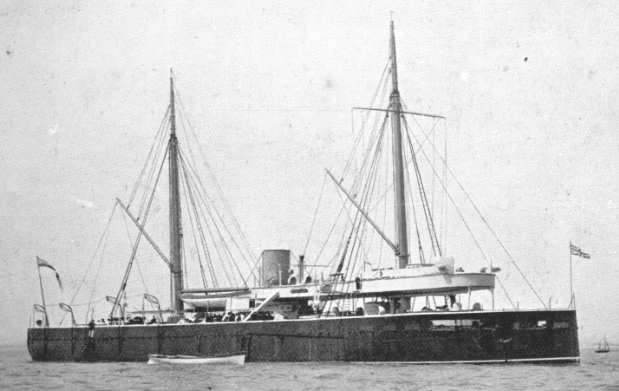
HMS Prince Albert, a pioneering turret ship

Before the development of large-calibre, long-range guns in the mid-19th century, the classic battleship design used rows of port-mounted guns on each side of the ship, often mounted in casemates. Firepower was provided by a large number of guns which could only be aimed in a limited arc from one side of the ship. Due to instability, fewer larger and heavier guns can be carried on a ship. Also, the casemates often sat near the waterline, which made them vulnerable to flooding and restricted their use to calm seas.

Turrets were weapon mounts designed to protect the crew and mechanism of the artillery piece and with the capability of being aimed and fired in many directions as a rotating weapon platform. This platform can be mounted on a fortified building or structure such as an anti-naval land battery, or on a combat vehicle, a naval ship, or a military aircraft.

During the Crimean War, Captain Cowper Phipps Coles constructed a raft with guns protected by a 'cupola' and used the raft, named Lady Nancy, to shell the Russian town of Taganrog in the Black Sea. Lady Nancy "proved a great success", and Coles patented his rotating turret after the war. Following Coles' patenting, the British Admiralty ordered a prototype of Coles' design in 1859, which was installed in the floating battery vessel, HMS Trusty, for trials in 1861, becoming the first warship to be fitted with a revolving gun turret. Coles' design aim was to create a ship with the greatest possible all round arc of fire, as low in the water as possible to minimise the target.

The Admiralty accepted the principle of the turret gun as a useful innovation, and incorporated it into other new designs. Coles submitted a design for a ship having ten domed turrets each housing two large guns. The design was rejected as impractical, although the Admiralty remained interested in turret ships and instructed its own designers to create better designs. Coles enlisted the support of Prince Albert, who wrote to the first Lord of the Admiralty, the Duke of Somerset, supporting the construction of a turret ship. In January 1862, the Admiralty agreed to construct a ship, HMS Prince Albert, which had four turrets and a low freeboard, intended only for coastal defence. Coles was allowed to design the turrets, but the ship was the responsibility of the chief Constructor Isaac Watts.

Another of Coles' designs, HMS Royal Sovereign, was completed in August 1864. Its existing broadside guns were replaced with four turrets on a flat deck and the ship was fitted with 5.5 inches (140 mm) of armour in a belt around the waterline. Early ships like Monitor and Royal Sovereign had little sea-keeping qualities, being limited to coastal waters. Coles, in collaboration with Sir Edward James Reed, went on to design and build HMS Monarch, the first seagoing warship to carry her guns in turrets. Laid down in 1866 and completed in June 1869, it carried two turrets, although the inclusion of a forecastle and poop prevented the guns firing fore and aft.

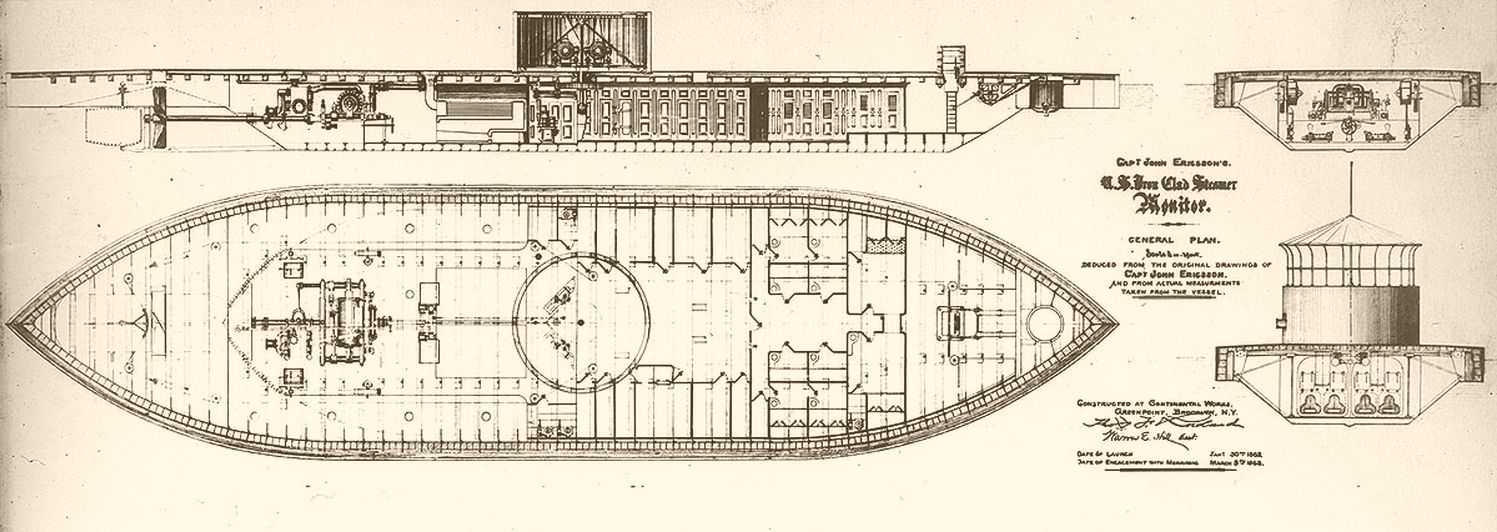
Inboard plans of USS Monitor

The gun turret was independently invented by the Swedish inventor John Ericsson in America, although his design was technologically inferior to Coles'. Ericsson designed USS Monitor in 1861. Its most prominent feature was a large cylindrical gun turret mounted amidships above the low-freeboard upper hull, also called the "raft". This extended well past the sides of the lower, more traditionally shaped hull. A small armored pilot house was fitted on the upper deck towards the bow, however, its position prevented Monitor from firing her guns straight forward. (Note: Ericsson later admitted that this was a serious flaw in the ship's design and that the pilot house should have been placed atop the turret.) One of Ericsson's prime goals in designing the ship was to present the smallest possible target to enemy gunfire.

The turret's rounded shape helped to deflect cannon shot. A pair of donkey engines rotated the turret through a set of gears; a full rotation was made in 22.5 seconds during testing on 9 February 1862. Fine control of the turret proved to be difficult as the engine would have to be placed in reverse if the turret overshot its mark or another full rotation could be made. Including the guns, the turret weighed approximately 160 long tons (163 t); the entire weight rested on an iron spindle that had to be jacked up using a wedge before the turret could rotate.

The spindle was 9 inches (23 cm) in diameter, which gave it ten times the strength needed in preventing the turret from sliding sideways. When not in use, the turret rested on a brass ring on the deck that was intended to form a watertight seal. In service, however, this proved to leak heavily, despite caulking by the crew. The gap between the turret and the deck proved to be a problem as debris and shell fragments entered the gap and jammed the turrets of several Passaic-class monitors, which used the same turret design, during the First Battle of Charleston Harbor in April 1863. Direct hits at the turret with heavy shot also had the potential to bend the spindle, which could also jam the turret.

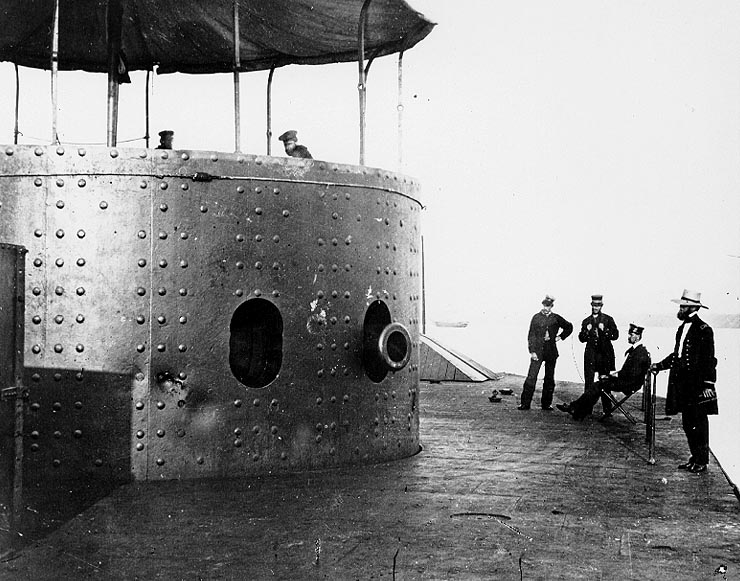
Turret of USS Monitor showing the muzzle of one of its pair of 11-inch (280 mm) smoothbore Dahlgren guns

The turret was intended to mount a pair of 15-inch (380 mm) smoothbore Dahlgren guns, but they were not ready in time and 11-inch (280 mm) guns were substituted. Each gun weighed approximately 16,000 pounds (7,300 kg). Monitor's guns used the standard propellant charge of 15 pounds (6.8 kg) specified by the 1860 ordnance for targets "distant", "near", and "ordinary", established by the gun's designer Dahlgren himself. They could fire a 136-pound (61.7 kg) round shot or shell up to a range of 3,650 yards (3,340 m) at an elevation of +15°.

HMS Thunderer represented the culmination of this pioneering work. An ironclad turret ship designed by Edward James Reed, it was equipped with revolving turrets that used pioneering hydraulic turret machinery to maneouvre the guns. It was also the world's first mastless battleship, built with a central superstructure layout, and became the prototype for all subsequent warships. HMS Devastation of 1871 was another pivotal design, and led directly to the modern battleship.

=== Armour-piercing shot ===
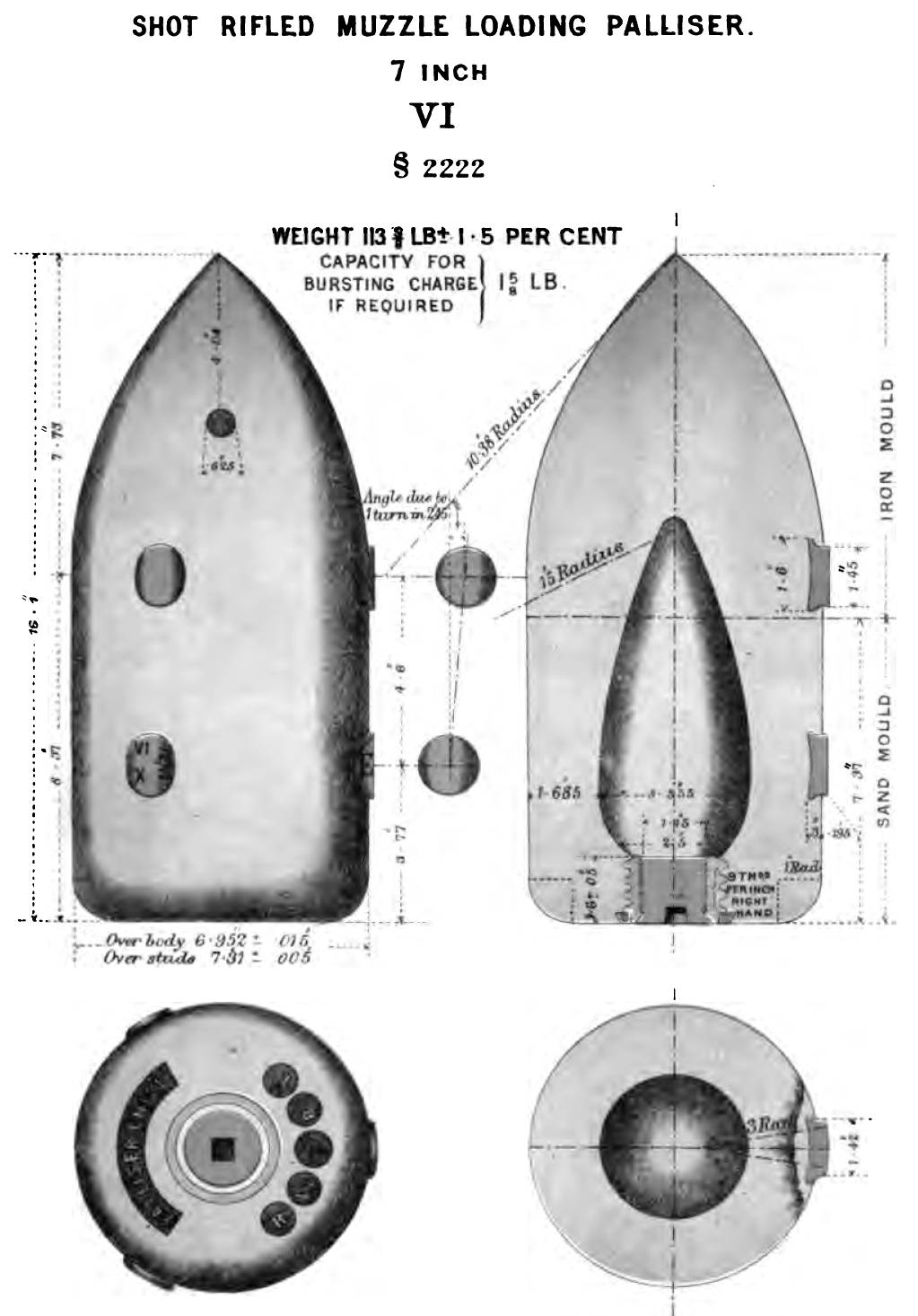
Palliser shot, the first armour-piercing shot for RML 7 inch gun, 1877

During the late 1850s, the development and implementation of the ironclad warship carried wrought iron armor of considerable thickness. This armor was practically immune to both the round cast-iron cannonballs then in use and to the recently developed explosive shell.

The first solution to this problem was effected by Major Sir W. Palliser. His Palliser shot, approved in 1867, was made of cast iron, the head being chilled in casting to harden it, using composite molds with a metal, water cooled portion for the head. At times there were defects that led to cracking in the projectiles but these were overcome with time. Bronze studs were installed into the outside of the projectile so as to engage the rifling grooves in the gun barrel. The base had a hollow pocket but was not filled with powder or explosive: the cavity was necessitated by difficulties in casting large solid projectiles without their cracking when they cooled, because the nose and base of the projectiles cooled at different rates, and in fact a larger cavity facilitated a better quality casting.

At the Battle of Angamos (8 October 1879) the Chilean ironclad warships fired twenty 250-pound-Palliser gunshots against the Peruvian monitor Huáscar, with devastating results. It was the first time that such piercing shells were used in actual combat.

These chilled iron shots proved very effective against wrought iron armor, but were not serviceable against compound and steel armor, which was first introduced in the 1880s. A new departure therefore had to be made, and forged steel rounds with points hardened by water took the place of the Palliser shot. At first, these forged-steel rounds were made of ordinary carbon steel, but as armor improved in quality, the projectiles followed suit.

From the 1890s onwards, cemented steel armor became commonplace, initially only on the thicker armor of warships. To combat this, the projectile was formed of steel—forged or cast—containing both nickel and chromium. Another change was the introduction of a soft metal cap over the point of the shell – so called "Makarov tips" invented by Russian admiral Stepan Makarov. This "cap" increased penetration by cushioning some of the impact shock and preventing the armor-piercing point from being damaged before it struck the armor face, or the body of the shell from shattering. It could also help penetration from an oblique angle by keeping the point from deflecting away from the armor face.

Increased armor penetration became possible when projectile velocities of 800 m/s (2,600 ft/s) were obtained as smokeless powder propellants replaced gunpowder around the turn of the 20th century.

=== Quick-firing artillery ===
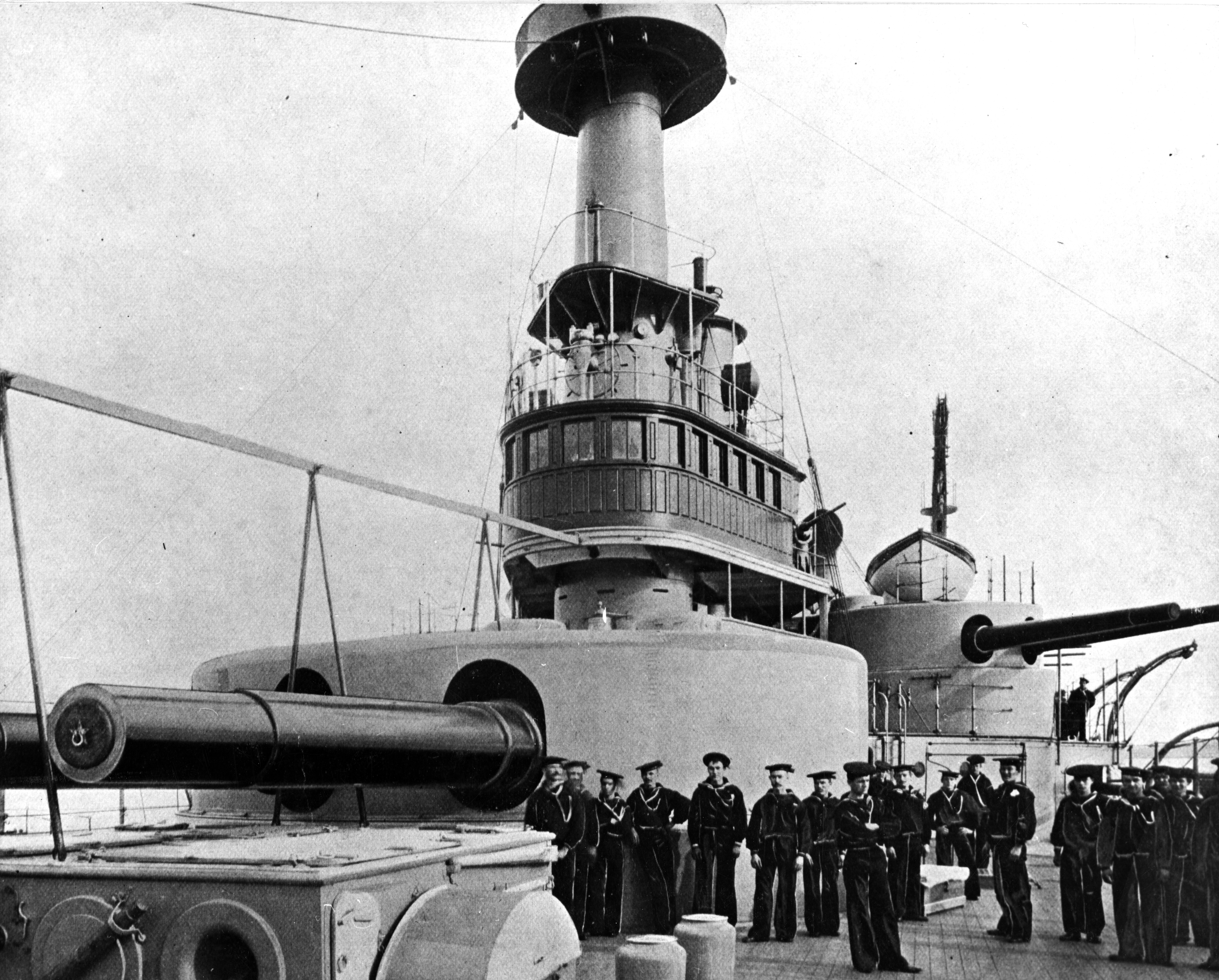
USS Indiana, an example of the intermediate battery principle with its forward 13-inch and forward port 8-inch gun turrets

Underwater hull damage possible with torpedoes encouraged development of small, inexpensive torpedo boats capable of sinking the largest warships. By the end of the 19th century, all warships required a defensive battery of quick-firing guns capable of hitting fast, maneuverable torpedo boats.

The Royal Navy first introduced the quick-firing 4.7-inch gun in HMS Sharpshooter in 1889, and the quick-firing 6-inch MK 1 in HMS Royal Sovereign, launched 1891. Other navies followed suit; the French Navy installed quick-firing weapons on its ships completed in 1894–95.

Quick-firing guns were a key characteristic of the pre-dreadnought battleship, the dominant design of the 1890s. The quick-firing guns, while unable to penetrate thick armour, were intended to destroy the superstructure of an opposing battleship, start fires, and kill or distract the enemy's gun crews. The development of heavy guns and their increasing rate of fire meant that the quick-firer lost its status as the decisive weapon of naval combat in the early 1900s, though quick-firing guns were vital to defend battleships from attack by torpedo boats and destroyers, and formed the main armament of smaller vessels.

Most late-19th-century warships mounted naval artillery of more than one caliber because of uncertainty about the relative destruction possible from a few large shells (which might miss) in comparison to the increased hit probability of a larger number of less damaging small-caliber shells fired within the same time period. Quick-firing guns were initially breech-loading weapons firing ammunition small enough to be loaded by hand. Later substitution of brass cartridges for silk powder bags allowed increased rates of fire using sliding wedge breech blocks. Increasing mechanization ultimately enabled similar rates of fire from naval artillery calibers up to 8 inches (20 cm).

=== Fire control ===
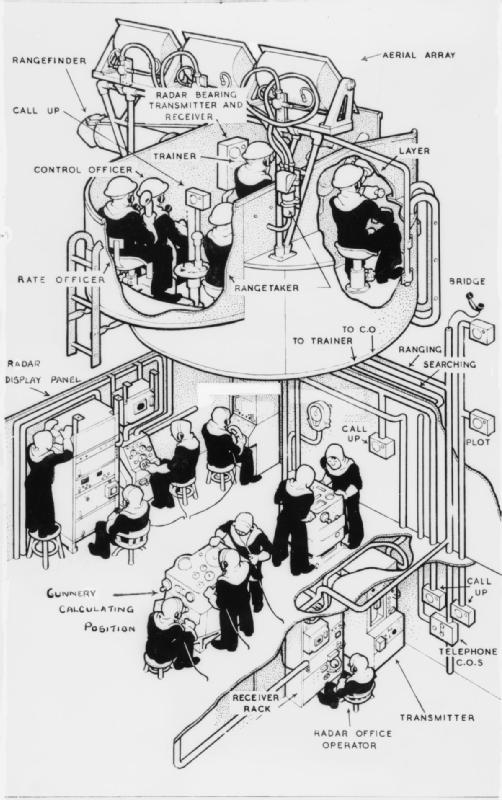
Accurate fire control systems were introduced in the early 20th century. Pictured, a cut-away view of a destroyer. The below decks analog computer is shown in the centre of the drawing and is labelled "Gunnery Calculating Position".

When gunnery ranges increased dramatically in the late 19th century, it was no longer a simple matter of calculating the proper aim point, given the flight times of the shells. Increasingly sophisticated mechanical calculators were employed for proper gunlaying, typically with various spotters and distance measures being sent to a central plotting station deep within the ship. There the fire direction teams fed in the location, speed and direction of the ship and its target, as well as various adjustments for Coriolis effect, weather effects on the air, and other adjustments.

The resulting directions, known as a firing solution, would then be fed back out to the turrets for laying. If the rounds missed, an observer could work out how far they missed by and in which direction, and this information could be fed back into the computer along with any changes in the rest of the information and another shot attempted.

The situation for naval fire control was highly complex, due to the need to control the firing of several guns at once. In naval engagements both the firing guns and target are moving, and the variables are compounded by the greater distances and times involved. Rudimentary naval fire control systems were first developed around the time of World War I.

Arthur Pollen and Frederic Charles Dreyer independently developed the first such systems. Pollen began working on the problem after noting the poor accuracy of naval artillery at a gunnery practice near Malta in 1900. Lord Kelvin, widely regarded as Britain's leading scientist, first proposed using an analogue computer to solve the equations which arise from the relative motion of the ships engaged in the battle and the time delay in the flight of the shell to calculate the required trajectory and therefore the direction and elevation of the guns.

Pollen aimed to produce a combined mechanical computer and automatic plot of ranges and rates for use in centralised fire control. To obtain accurate data of the target's position and relative motion, Pollen developed a plotting unit (or plotter) to capture this data. He added a gyroscope to allow for the yaw of the firing ship. Again this required substantial development of the, at the time, primitive gyroscope to provide continuous reliable correction. Trials were carried out in 1905 and 1906, which although completely unsuccessful showed promise. He was encouraged in his efforts by the rapidly rising figure of Admiral Jackie Fisher, Admiral Arthur Knyvet Wilson and the Director of Naval Ordnance and Torpedoes (DNO), John Jellicoe. Pollen continued his work, with tests carried out on Royal Navy warships intermittently.

Meanwhile, a group led by Dreyer designed a similar system. Although both systems were ordered for new and existing ships of the Royal Navy, the Dreyer system eventually found most favour with the Navy in its definitive Mark IV* form. The addition of director control facilitated a full, practicable fire control system for World War I ships, and most RN capital ships were so fitted by mid 1916. The director was high up over the ship where operators had a superior view over any gunlayer in the turrets. It was also able to co-ordinate the fire of the turrets so that their combined fire worked together. This improved aiming and larger optical rangefinders improved the estimate of the enemy's position at the time of firing. The system was eventually replaced by the improved "Admiralty Fire Control Table" for ships built after 1927.

=== Big-gun battleships ===
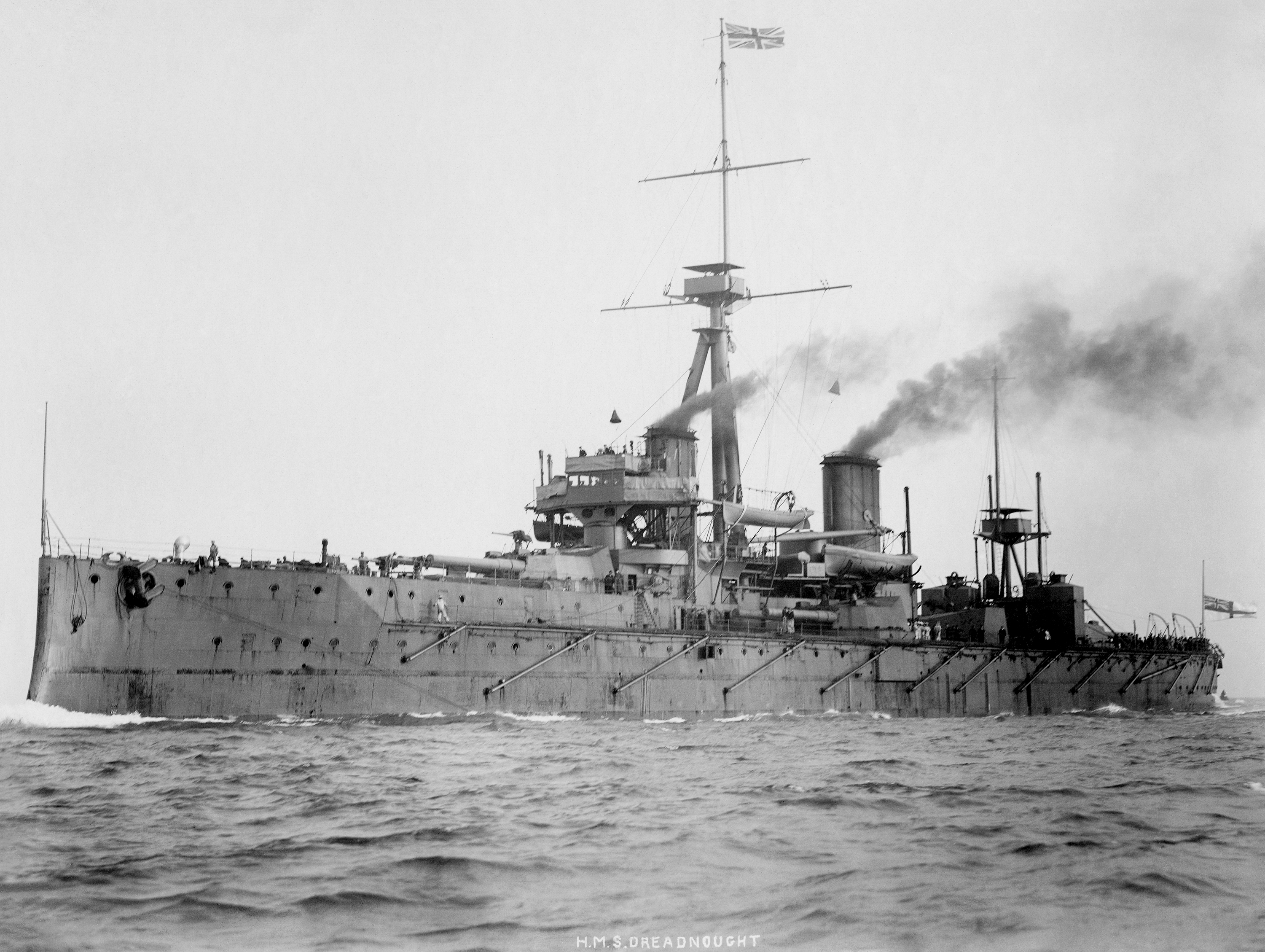
Launched in 1906, HMS Dreadnaught was the first all big-gun warship

Significant gunnery developments occurred in the late 1890s and the early 1900s, culminating with the launch of the revolutionary HMS Dreadnought in 1906. Sir Percy Scott was given command of HMS Scylla in 1896, where he was able to implement his new theories on gunnery, scoring the unprecedented success of 80% during the 1897 gunnery trials. This was totally unprecedented, as the average in the Royal Navy was just 28%.

Scott noted that night time signalling between ships in the fleet was slow and inaccurate. He addressed this in two ways: he devised training aids and put his signallers under instruction and he devised a new more effective flashing lamp. The new efficiency of his ship's signalling was adopted by the whole Mediterranean fleet. He devised a new sub-calibre gun which involved fitting a one-inch-calibre rifled barrel inside the barrel of the main armament but which used the main gun's controls. He also came up with new sights employing telescope optics and new training targets. In the Navy's 1901 prize firing, Terrible achieved the same score of 80%, and Scott's gunnery practices were adopted by other ships in the fleet. Later, Scott taught at the naval gunnery school at Whale Island, Hampshire. a largely honorary role which he held until promotion to flag rank in 1905.

The development of the torpedo meant that it became necessary to engage an enemy at ranges outside torpedo range. This in turn meant that the old system whereby a gunlayer in each turret pointed and fired the turret guns independently could no longer be expected to achieve a significant hit rate on an opposing ship. Scott was instrumental in encouraging the development and installation of director firing, a system whereby the guns were all pointed, elevated and fired from a single point, usually at the top of the foremast. By firing all the guns simultaneously it was possible to observe the simultaneous splashes produced and correct the aim visually.

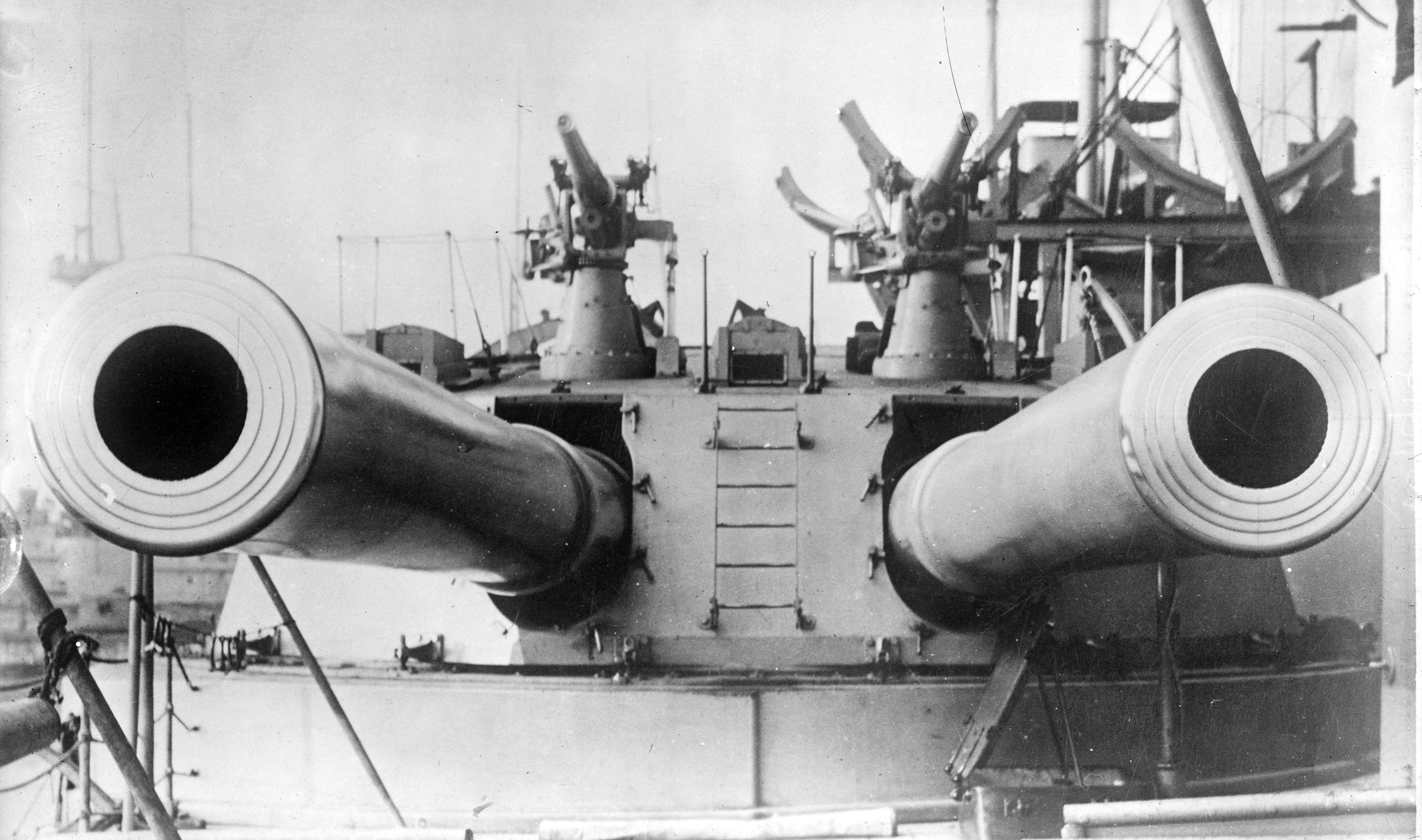
Turret with twin 12-inch Mk X guns. Two 12-pounder guns for defence against torpedo boats are mounted on the roof.

As battle ranges were pushed out to an unprecedented 6,000 yards (5,500 m), the distance was great enough to force gunners to wait for the shells to arrive before applying corrections for the next salvo. A related problem was that the shell splashes from the more numerous smaller weapons tended to obscure the splashes from the bigger guns. Either the smaller-calibre guns would have to hold their fire to wait for the slower-firing heavies, losing the advantage of their faster rate of fire, or it would be uncertain whether a splash was due to a heavy or a light gun, making ranging and aiming unreliable. Italian naval architect Vittorio Cuniberti first argued for the concept of an all-big-gun battleship in 1903, proposing an "ideal" future British battleship of 17,000 long tons (17,000 t), with a main battery of a dozen 12-inch guns in eight turrets, 12 inches of belt armour, and a speed of 24 knots (44 km/h; 28 mph).

First Sea Lord Sir John Fisher pushed through the Board of Admiralty a decision to arm the next battleship with 12-inch guns and that it would have a speed no less than 21 knots (39 km/h). The result was HMS Dreadnought, which rendered all previous ships immediately obsolete on its launch in 1906. The ship mounted the 45-calibre BL 12-inch Mark X gun in five twin gun turrets. These could deliver a broadside of a maximum of eight guns and could be elevated up to +13.5°. They fired 850-pound (390 kg) projectiles at a muzzle velocity of 2,725 ft/s (831 m/s); at 13.5°, this provided a maximum range of 16,450 m (17,990 yd) with armour-piercing (AP) 2 crh shells. At 16° elevation, the range was extended to 20,435 yd (18,686 m) using the more aerodynamic, but slightly heavier 4 crh AP shells. The rate of fire of these guns was one to two rounds per minute. The ships carried 80 rounds per gun.

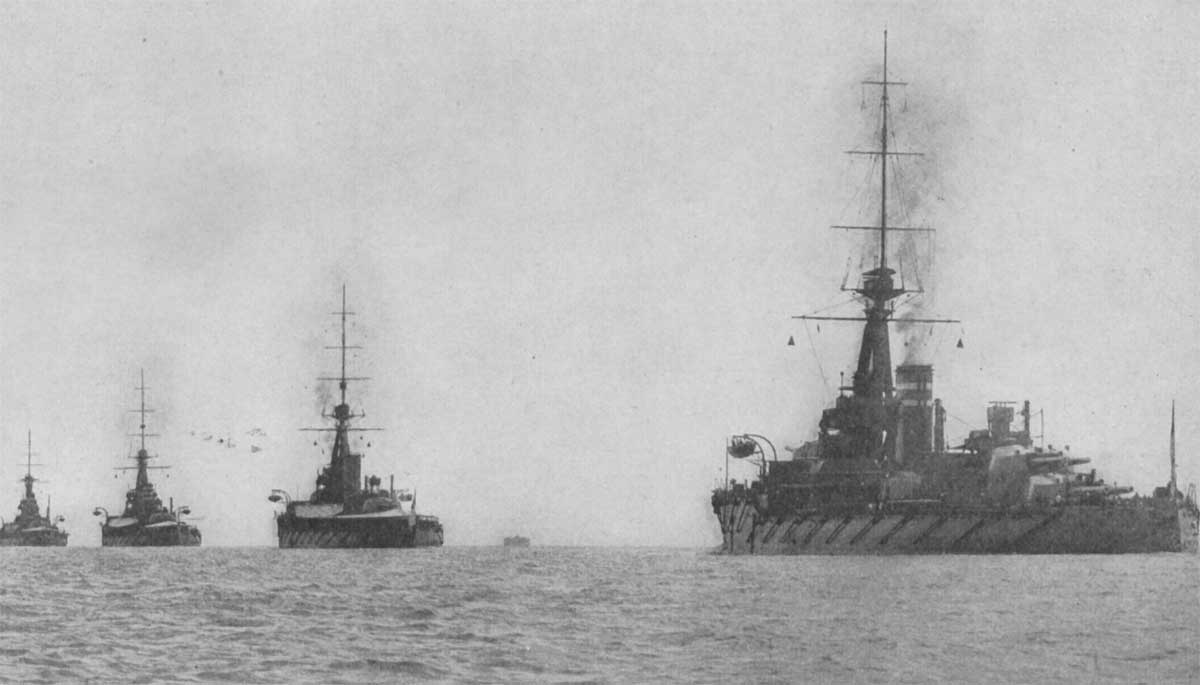
The Orion-class battleships in line c. 1914

Within five years of the commissioning of Dreadnought, a new generation of more powerful "super-dreadnoughts" was being built. The arrival of the super-dreadnought is commonly believed to have started with the British Orion class. What made them 'super' was the unprecedented 2,000-ton jump in displacement, the introduction of the heavier 13.5-inch (343 mm) gun, and the placement of all the main armament on the centerline. In the four years between Dreadnought and Orion, displacement had increased by 25%, and weight of broadside had doubled.

In comparison to the rapid advancement of the preceding half-century, naval artillery changed comparatively little through World War I and World War II. Battleships remained similar to Dreadnought, torpedo boats evolved into destroyers, and ships of intermediate size were called cruisers. All ship types became larger as the calibre of heavy guns increased (to a maximum of 46 centimetres (18.1 in) in the Yamato-class battleships), but the number of guns carried remained similar. Smaller ships used smaller-calibre weapons which were also used on battleships as the defensive secondary armament.

=== High-angle artillery (dual purpose, anti-aircraft and anti-surface) ===
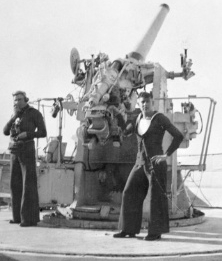
Gunners with a high angle QF 4-inch MK V gun on HMAS Canberra c. 1940.

Although naval artillery had been designed to perform within the classical broadside tactics of the age of sail, World War I demonstrated the need for naval artillery mounts capable of greater elevation for defending against aircraft. High-velocity naval artillery intended to puncture side armor at close range was theoretically capable of hitting targets miles away with the aid of fire control directors; but the maximum elevation of guns mounted within restrictive armored casemates prevented reaching those ranges.

The QF 4 inch Mk V naval gun was one of the first artillery pieces to be adapted as an anti-aircraft gun and mounted on ships for defence. It was first used in 1914 as a secondary armament on Arethusa-class cruisers in a high-angle anti-aircraft role.

Most naval artillery on ships built after World War I was capable of elevating to at least 45°, and some guns as large as 8 inches (20 cm) were capable of elevating to 70° for potential use against aircraft. The Japanese used their large caliber guns for anti-aircraft defense when employing San Shiki "beehive" shells.

Dual purpose guns were devised to protect ships against both torpedo boats and aircraft, and for WWII they comprised the primary armament on frigates and destroyers, and the secondary armament on cruisers and battleships. Dual purpose guns such as the US Navy's 5-inch (127 mm) /38 caliber guns functioned as heavy anti-aircraft artillery, firing VT shells (proximity fuzed-shells) that would detonate when they came close to an enemy aircraft, and could also aim into the water to create waterspouts which could bring down low flying aircraft such as torpedo planes. The light anti-aircraft artillery typically consisted of autocannons such as the Bofors 40 mm anti-aircraft guns and 65 single Oerlikon 20 mm cannon.

As destroyers began to assume ASW roles to include protection of the fleet from submarines, they were fitted with high-angle depth charge mortars (called Y-guns, K-guns or squid).

=== Naval bombardment ===
Naval bombardment of Scarborough by the Imperial German Navy in 1914

Battleships were used in support of amphibious operations since the late 19th century in the form of naval bombardment. Under international law such bombardments are regulated by the general law of war and the "Bombardment by Naval Forces in Time of War (Hague Convention IX)"; 18 October 1907.

At the beginning of World War I, its principal practitioner was the Royal Navy. During the War RN ships fired against targets at Gallipoli, the Salonika front and along the Belgian Coast. In the Aegean, the problems were not especially challenging, and enemy coastal defences (forts, shore-batteries etc.) were fairly unsophisticated; but along the Belgian Coast the Germans constructed an extensive, well-equipped and well-coordinated system of gun-batteries to defend the coast. Ports, such as Ostend and Zeebrugge were of major importance to the U-boat campaign and were frequently bombarded by British monitors operating from Dover and Dunkirk.

Animated naval gun operations: 1. Platform deck; 2. Shell room; 3. Lower deck; 4. Magazine; 5. Middle deck; 6. Trunk; 7. Main deck; 8. Barbette; 9. Working chamber; 10. Upper deck; 11. Roller path; 12. Cradle; 13. Gunhouse

The Royal Navy continually advanced their technology and techniques necessary to conduct effective bombardments in the face of the German defenders—firstly refining aerial reconnaissance techniques, then experimenting with night-bombardment and moving on to adopt indirect fire. Finally, in the summer of 1918, monitors were equipped with Gyro Director Training gear, which effectively provided the Director with a gyro-stabilised Artificial Line of Sight, and thereby enabled a ship to carry out Indirect Bombardment while underway. This was a very significant advance, and established a firm foundation for naval bombardment as practiced by the Royal Navy and United States Navy during World War II.

The practice reached its zenith during World War II, when the availability of man-portable radio systems and sophisticated relay networks allowed forward observers to transmit targeting information and provide almost instant accuracy reports—once troops had landed. Battleships, cruisers and destroyers would pound shore installations, sometimes for days, in the hope of reducing fortifications and attriting defending forces. Obsolete battleships unfit for combat against other ships were often used as floating gun platforms expressly for this purpose. However, given the relatively primitive nature of the fire control computers and radar of the era combined with the high velocity of naval gunfire, accuracy was poor until troops landed and were able to radio back reports to the ship.

Naval gunfire could reach as far as 20 miles (32 km) inland, and was often used to supplement land-based artillery. Shore bombardment was heavily utilized by U.S. naval forces ahead of landings at Iwo Jima, Okinawa, Peleliu, Tarawa, and Saipan in the Pacific Theatre of World War II. In the European Theatre, the heavy-calibre guns of some eighteen battleships and cruisers were used to stop German Panzer counterattack at Salerno. Naval gunfire was used extensively throughout the Normandy invasion, although initially the surprise nature of the landings themselves precluded a drawn-out bombardment which could have reduced the Atlantic Wall defences sufficiently, a challenge that fell to specialist armoured vehicles instead.

== Artillery ranges ==
Naval artillery ranges (in yards)
period	close (Note: close range: at this distance almost every salvo was considered a probable hit. It should not be confused with point-blank range)	medium (Note: medium range: considered typical for naval engagement. At this range accuracy was supposed to be at 15–20%, enabling a hit after some 4–5 salvos)	long (Note: long range: single hits inflicting some damage upon enemy ships were considered possible, though accuracy was expected to be very low, at 1–3%. It should not be confused with theoretical range of the gun or a range when hits produced almost no damage)
15th–16th cent.	5	15	300 (Note: "culverin, a long-barreled naval canon widely used in the 15th and 16th centuries, featured effective operating distance probably no more than 350 yards". Though single guns had a maximum theoretical range of 2,500 yards, in the mid-16th century most guns had the maximum range of 500 yards)
17th century	5	20 (Note: "most battles were fought at point-blank range, no further than a pistol shot and sometimes muzzle-to-muzzle".)	400 (Note: in the late 17th century "effective range for the heavy cannon" was perhaps 400 yards.)
18th century	5	30 (Note: 20-30 yards was typical or preferred range in the 18th century, effective range was 280 yards, and extreme range about a mile. In practice the gunners waited until the distance was 100 yards The English captains preferred to close at "pistol shot range" (some 20 yards) before opening fire.)	800 (Note: "half a mile" (800 yards) was maximum effective range, "extreme range about a mile")
early 19th cent.	20 (Note: at Trafalgar 30 yards was "close range")	50 (Note: "most naval battles were fought at musket shot (100 yards) or pistol shot (50 yards)" In 1812, USS Constitution engaged HMS Guerriere at 25–50 yards. "before 1850 ... the most effective and preferred distance was 100 yards – known as the half pistol".)	1,000 (Note: At Trafalgar the French fire from 1,000 yards was marginally accurate and produced little damage)
mid-19th cent.	50	300 (Note: in the early 19th century maximum effective range was some 400 yards. "few hundred yards" were "realistic ranges" during the 1860s.)	1,200 (Note: "Cast-iron smooth bore guns firing solid shot with a theoretical maximum hitting range of 1,000 yards were still the rule". During the American civil war warships were considered relatively safe from enemy fire at a range of 1,200-1,300 yards. Theoretical ranges of American naval smoothbores as defined by the US Navy in 1866 ranged from 1,756 (32-pounder) to 2,100 yards (XV-inch shell).)
1880s	200	500 (Note: in 1882 a British naval expert and MP claimed in the Commons that "the effective fire of guns will be delivered within rather beyond a range of 500 yards".)	1,500 (Note: in 1870 during a practice at 1,000 yards 3 British ironclads landed 1 hit out of 12 rounds against a ship-sized rock. In the 1870s the French naval planners considered protection armor against longest hits from a distance of 2,000 yards. "Ships were not expected to engage at more than 2,000 yards" in the 1880s. British naval expert and MP claimed that "the practice of naval guns in action at distances exceeding 1,000 yards" was uncertain and there was no sense adjusting powder capacity to go beyond that range.)
1890s	500 (Note: 200–300 yards was considered point blank range at the turn of the century.)	1,500 (Note: "distances of up to 1,000 yards became possible" by the mid-1890s. Until 1904 the British navy premier gunnery exercise, the Annual Prize Firings, were held at 1,400–1,600 yards.)	3,000 (Note: out of 8,000 rounds fired by American warships against stationary targets at a distance of 0.5–3 miles during a battle of the Spanish–American War there were 129 hits (ca 1.5%). Other sources note 2% accuracy at 2,000 yards during the same war.)
1900s	3,000 (Note: in the very early 20th century 4,000 yards was considered short distance in the British Navy.)	5,000 (Note: in 1905 the Royal Navy introduced 5,000–7,000 yards as best practice distance when firing against stationary targets.; during the Battle of Tsushima the Japanese achieved 20% accuracy at 6,500 yards)	10,000 (Note: under favorable conditions centrally controlled accurate salvo was deemed possible at 8,000 yards and under very favorable ones at 10,000 yards. "Within a decade [1890s to 1900s], the range of accurate naval gunnery had increased from 2,000 to 10,000 yards.")
1910s	5,000	8,000 (Note: in 1913 the Home Fleet commander issued orders which envisaged "decisive range" of 8,000–10,000. German commanders were instructed to fight at 7,000-9,000 yards.)	15,000 (Note: in 1913 the Home Fleet commander issued orders which envisaged opening fire at 15,000 weather permitting. During the Battle of Jutland of 1914 a 3% accuracy was achieved at a distance of 16,000 yards. In 1915 20,000 yards was considered extreme and basically theoretical range.)
1920s	8,000 (Note: In the early 1920s the US Navy produced a table which estimated average hit ratio for battleship gunfire; distances of 10,000 yards and below were not even considered.)	10,000 (Note: in the interwar period 15% was "realistic battle expectation" at 15,000 yards. US Navy practice with 3 battleships each firing 56 rounds at 12,800 range against a battleship-representative target led to conclusion that at this distance "opening salvos" should produce 7% accuracy. The US Navy table of the early 1920s estimated that for 18,000 yards the hit ratio was to be at 4.2%, for 16,000 yards at 6.2%, for 14,000 yards at 8.9% and for 12,000 yards at 12.3%.)	18,000 (Note: a table for battleship gunfire worked out by the US Navy envisioned that for 20,000 yards the hit ratio should be at 2.6%, for 22,000 yards at 1.5%, for 24,000 yards at 0.7% and at 26,000 yards at 0.1%)
1930s	10,000 (Note: 4,000 was considered point-blank range. Modern battleships avoided distances shorter than 10,000 yards, as at such a short range their technological advantage over older battleships would be wiped out)	15,000	20,000 (Note: Hood firing at Bismarck achieved 3,5% accuracy at 20,000 yards; Bismarck firing at Hood achieved 5% at the same distance. However, during training exercises of 1930 US Navy battleships used to open fire at the extreme range of 35,000 yards; it is not clear what the hit ratio was.)
1940s	15,000 (Note: battle plans prepared in the late 1930s by the US Navy envisioned that a close range would be anything under 17,000 yards)	20,000 (Note: battle plans prepared in the late 1930s by the US Navy envisioned that a moderate range would be between 17,000 and 20,000 yards)	25,000 (Note: the longest hits were recorded in 1940 by Scharnhorst firing at Glorious and by Warspite firing at Giulio Cesare, in both cases the distance was some 26,000 yards. The US Navy considered 28,000 yards "maximum effective range of battleship guns" if without aerial spotting.)

The effective range of naval artillery evolved over the course of its history.

== Modern naval artillery ==
By the mid-20th century, aircraft began to replace naval artillery as more effective weapons against ships, especially during World War II. This was particularly true of the Pacific Ocean theater where there ended up being far fewer engagements between surface combatants, including only two "battleship-versus-battleship" meetings. Most of the decisive battles in the Pacific were carrier-versus-carrier, included Coral Sea, the first battle in which the opposing ships neither sighted nor fired directly upon one another, followed by Midway, the Eastern Solomons, and the Santa Cruz Islands in 1942; and the Philippine Sea in 1944. Larger surface combatants (cruisers, battleships) thus employed their large caliber naval guns mostly for shore bombardment. Also, the Japanese fired San Shiki "beehive" shells for anti-aircraft defense, as did the German battleship Tirpitz, but this largely proved ineffective against attacking aircraft.

Naval artillery calibers greater than 130 mm (5.1 in) were not installed on most new ships after World War II. (Note: The US Navy installed six 155 mm (6.1 in) Advanced Gun Systems, but these were non-operational as no ammunition was produced.) With the progression of ship design away from heavy caliber guns, nearly all main gun armaments developed since then are dual-purpose, able to fire at both naval and airborne targets. Ships who remained in service equipped with old large-caliber artillery were used only for naval gunfire support, as the anti-ship missile has supplanted naval guns for ship-versus-ship combat. USS Missouri, the last active battleship with large-caliber guns (16 in (410 mm)) was decommissioned in 1992. Submarines shed their deck guns as a handicap in modern naval tactics.

After World War II, guided missiles were retrofitted to certain surface combatants. New classes of vessels were designed with guided missiles as the primary weaponry, notably the Royal Navy's Type 22 frigate whose Batch 1 and Batch 2 subclasses lacked a main gun while only carrying a pair of 40 mm anti-aircraft guns although the Batch 3 was redesigned to include a 4.5-inch Mark 8 dual-purpose main gun. Modern cruisers, destroyers, and frigates often carry 1-2 dual-purpose guns, as a backup to missile systems for anti-aircraft defense and capable of land fire support, ranging from 3 inch to 5.1 inch (76 to 130 mm) calibre. Many modern warships also carry a Close-in weapon system such as the 20 mm Phalanx CIWS as a last ditch short-range defence against anti-ship missiles or aircraft that got through the other defense systems.

Modern naval artillery is capable and still relevant. For example, the Italian 127 mm (~5 inch) Otobreda 127/54 Compact can fire up to 40 rounds a minute at a range of over 23 kilometres (25,153 yd), or up to 100 kilometres (62 mi) when using rocket-boosted, terminal guided "Vulcano GLR" rounds.

Smaller, multi-role vessels are also seeing a resurgence. The Ukrainian Gyurza M-Class Gunboat is an example, armed with 2 turrets built by Mykolayiv Mechanical Repair Plant.

== See also ==
- Coastal artillery – Defensive military service branch
- List of naval guns
- List of artillery by type

== Cited sources ==
- Adkins, Roy (2006). Nelson's Trafalgar: The Battle That Changed the World. Penguin. ISBN 978-1-4406-2729-3.
- Armstrong, Benjamin (June 2010). "From River Pirate to Ming Emperor". Naval History. 24 (3). US Naval Institute.
- Bannerman, David B. (1954). Bannerman 90th Anniversary Military Goods Catalog. New York: Francis Bannerman Sons.
- Barford, Jørgen (1990). Flådens fødsel [The Birth of the Fleet] (in Danish). Marinehistorisk Selskab. ISBN 978-87-87720-08-3.
- Barnaby, K. C. (1968). Some ship disasters and their causes. London: Hutchinson. pp. 20–30.
- Bastable, Marshall J. (1992). "From Breechloaders to Monster Guns: Sir William Armstrong and the Invention of Modern Artillery, 1854–1880". Technology and Culture. 33 (2): 213–247. doi:10.2307/3105857. JSTOR 3105857. S2CID 112105821.
- Baxter, James Phinney III (1968) [1933]. The Introduction of the Ironclad Warship (reprint of the 1933 publication ed.). Hamden, Connecticut: Archon Books. OCLC 695838727.
- Bennett, Geoffrey (2003). Naval Battles of World War II. ISBN 978-0-85052-989-0.
- Blackmore, David S. T. (2011). Warfare on the Mediterranean in the Age of Sail: A History, 1571–1866. McFarland. ISBN 978-0-7864-5784-7.
- Block, Leo (2003). To Harness the Wind: A Short History of the Development of Sails. Naval Institute Press. ISBN 978-1-55750-209-4.
- Brassey, Thomas (1882). The British Navy: Its Strengths, Resources, and Administration. Vol. II. London: Longmans, Green and Co.
- Breemer, Jan S. (2011). Robson, Martin (ed.). The Great Race: Innovation and Counter-Innovation at Sea, 1840–1890 (Report). King's College London. Corbett Papers No. 2.
- Breyer, Sigfried (1973). Battleships and Battle Cruisers, 1905–1970. London: Doubleday. ISBN 978-0-385-07247-2.
- Broadwater, John D. (2012). USS Monitor: A Historic Ship Completes Its Final Voyage. Texas A&M University Press. ISBN 978-1-60344-473-6.
- Brown, David K. (2003). Warrior to Dreadnought: Warship Development 1860–1905 (reprint of 1997 ed.). London: Caxton Editions. ISBN 978-1-84067-529-0.
- Bruce, Anthony; Cogar, William (2014). Encyclopedia of Naval History. Routledge. ISBN 978-1-135-93534-4.
- Bull, Stephen (2004). "Bomb Vessel". Encyclopedia of Military Technology and Innovation. Greenwood Publishing Group. p. 44. ISBN 978-1-57356-557-8.
- Burt, R. A. (1986). British Battleships of World War One. Annapolis, Maryland: Naval Institute Press. ISBN 978-0-87021-863-7.
- Campbell, John (1985). Naval Weapons of World War II. Annapolis, Maryland: Naval Institute Press. ISBN 978-0-87021-459-2.
- Canney, Donald L. (1993). The Ironclads, 1842–1885. The Old Steam Navy. Vol. 2. Annapolis, Maryland: Naval Institute Press. ISBN 978-0-87021-586-5.
- Castex, Jean-Claude (2012). "Arnemuiden". Dictionnaire des batailles navales franco-anglaises [Dictionary of Franco-English Naval Battles] (in French). Les Éditions du Phare-Ouest. pp. 18–21. ISBN 978-2-921668-19-4.
- Ehrman, John (2012). The Navy in the War of William III 1689–1697: Its State and Direction. Cambridge University Press. ISBN 978-1-107-64511-0.
- Fairfield, A. P. (1921). Naval Ordnance. Lord Baltimore Press.
- Field, Ron (2011). Confederate Ironclad vs Union Ironclad: Hampton Roads. Osprey Publishing. ISBN 978-1-78096-141-5.
- Frieden, David (1985). Principles of Naval Weapons Systems. Annapolis, Maryland: Naval Institute Press. ISBN 978-0-87021-537-7.
- Friedman, Norman (2008). Naval Firepower: Battleship Guns and Gunnery in the Dreadnought Era. Annapolis, Maryland: Naval Institute Press. ISBN 978-1-59114-555-4.
- Gardiner, Robert; Lambert, Andrew, eds. (2001). Steam, Steel and Shellfire: The Steam Warship, 1815–1905. Conway's History of the Ship. Book Sales. ISBN 978-0-7858-1413-9.
- Guilmartin, John F. Jr. (1974). Gunpowder and Galleys: Changing Technology and Mediterranean Warfare at Sea in the Sixteenth Century. London: Cambridge University Press. ISBN 0-521-20272-8.
- Guilmartin, John F. Jr. (1983). "The Guns of the Santíssimo Sacramento". Technology and Culture. 24 (4): 563. doi:10.2307/3104249. JSTOR 3104249.
- Guilmartin, John F. Jr. (1989). Smith, Robert D. (ed.). Ballistics in the Black Powder era. British naval armament 1600–1900. London: Trustees of the Royal Armouries. pp. 73–98.
- Hildred, Alexzandra (2009). "The Fighting Ship". In Marsden, Peter (ed.). Mary Rose: Your Noblest Shippe: Anatomy of a Tudor Warship. The Archaeology of the Mary Rose. Vol. 2. Portsmouth: The Mary Rose Trust. pp. 297–344. ISBN 978-0-9544029-2-1.
- Holley, Alexander L. (1865). Treatise on Ordnance and Armor. New York: D. Van Nostrand.
- Hone, Trent (October 2002). "Building a Doctrine: U.S. Naval Tactics and Battle Plans in the Interwar Period" (PDF). International Journal of Naval History. 1 (2). Archived (PDF) from the original on 19 May 2025.
- Lardas, Mark (2012). Constitution vs Guerriere: Frigates during the War of 1812. Bloomsbury. ISBN 978-1-84908-094-1.
- Lavery, Brian (1986). The Ship of the Line: Design, Construction and Fittings. Vol. II. London: Conway Maritime Press. ISBN 978-0-85177-287-5.
- Lyon, David; Winfield, Rif (2004). The Sail and Steam Navy List, all the ships of the Royal Navy 1815–1889. Chatham. ISBN 1-86176-032-9.
- Manucy, Albert C. (1994). Artillery Through the Ages: A Short Illustrated History of Cannon, Emphasizing Types Used in America. DIANE. ISBN 978-0-7881-0745-0.
- Marshall, George (1822). Marshall's Practical Marine Gunnery. Norfolk, Virginia: C. Hall.
- McCordock, Robert Stanley (1938). The Yankee Cheese Box. Dorrance.
- McLeod, A. B. (2012). British Naval Captains of the Seven Years' War: The View from the Quarterdeck. Boydell Press. ISBN 978-1-84383-751-0.
- Mindell, David A. (2000). War, Technology, and Experience Aboard the USS Monitor. Johns Hopkins University Press. ISBN 978-0-8018-6250-2.
- Murdoch, R. H. (1894). "Memoirs Historical and Biographical: The Brome-Walton Family". Journal of the Royal Artillery Institution. 21. Woolwich (London): Dulau & Co.: 31.
- Needham, Joseph (1987). Science and Civilisation in China: Military technology: The Gunpowder Epic, Volume 5, Part 7. Cambridge University Press. ISBN 978-0-521-30358-3.
- Olmstead, Edwin; Stark, Wayne E.; Tucker, Spencer C. (1997). The Big Guns: Civil War Siege, Seacoast, and Naval Cannon. Alexandria Bay, New York: Museum Restoration Service. ISBN 978-0-88855-012-5.
- Padfield, Peter (1968). Aim Straight: A Biography of Admiral Sir Percy Scott. London: Hodder and Stoughton.
- Pike, John, ed. (22 July 2011). "Sailing Ship Armament". GlobalSecurity.org. Cannon (section). Archived from the original on 16 February 2018.
- Pitassi, Michael (2012). "Chapter 2: The Ships: Shipboard Weapons". The Roman Navy: Ships, Men & Warfare, 350 BC – AD 475. Barnsley, UK: Seaforth Publ. ISBN 978-1-84832-090-1.
- Pitassi, Michael (2022). "Chapter 3: Rams, Towers, Artillery and Tactics". Hellenistic Naval Warfare and Warships 336–30 BC: War at Sea from Alexander to Actium. Barnsley, UK: Pen & Sword Military. ISBN 978-1-3990-9760-4.
- Pollen, Anthony (1980). The Great Gunnery Scandal: The Mystery of Jutland. Collins. ISBN 978-0-00216-298-2.
- Potter, E. B.; Nimitz, Chester (1960). Sea Power: A Naval History. Englewood Cliffs, New Jersey: Prentice-Hall. OCLC 220797839.
- Preston, Antony (2002). The World's Worst Warships. London: Conway Maritime Press. ISBN 978-0-85177-754-2.
- Ramsey, H. C. (1918). "XVIII: Fire Control". Elementary Naval Ordnance and Gunnery (PDF).
- Reed, Edward James (1869). Our Iron-clad Ships: Their Qualities, Performances, and Cost. With Chapters on Turret Ships, Iron-clad Rams. London: J. Murray.
- Rodger, Nicholas A. M. (1996). "The Development of Broadside Gunnery, 1450–1650". The Mariner's Mirror. 82 (3). Society for Nautical Research: 302. doi:10.1080/00253359.1996.10656604.
- Rodger, Nicholas A. M. (1997). The Safeguard of the Sea: A Naval History of Britain 660–1649. W. W. Norton & Company, New York. pp. 205–207. ISBN 978-0-393-04579-6.
- Rodger, Nicholas A. M. (2004). The Command of the Ocean: A Naval History of Britain 1649–1815. Penguin Books. ISBN 978-0-14-028896-4.
- Rodriguez, Jorge. N.; Devezas, Tessaleno C. (2009). Portugal: o pioneiro da globalização: a Herança das descobertas [Portugal: Pioneer of Globalization: the Legacy of Discoveries] (in Portuguese). Lisbon: Centro Atlantico. ISBN 978-989-615-077-8.
- Sandler, Stanley (2004). Battleships: An Illustrated History of Their Impact. ABC-CLIO. ISBN 978-1-85109-410-3. Archived from the original on 29 May 2016.
- Scott, Percy (1919). Fifty Years in the Royal Navy. London: John Murray.
- Sharpe, Philip B. (1953). Complete Guide to Handloading (3 ed.). New York: Funk and Wagnalls. OCLC 500118405.
- Thompson, Stephen C. (1990). "The Design and Construction of the USS Monitor". Warship International. XXVII (3). Toledo, Ohio: International Naval Research Organization. ISSN 0043-0374.
- Tucker, Spencer (2000). Handbook of 19th Century Naval Warfare. Naval Institute Press. ISBN 978-0-7509-1972-2.
- Tucker, Spencer (2006). Blue & Gray Navies: the Civil War Afloat. Maryland: Naval Institute Press. ISBN 978-1-59114-882-1.
- Tucker, Spencer; Pierpaoli, Paul G.; White, William E. (2011). The Civil War Naval Encyclopedia. Vol. 1. Bloomsbury Academic. ISBN 978-1-59884-338-5.
- Wade, Geoff (2005). "The Zheng He Voyages: A Reassessment". Journal of the Malaysian Branch of the Royal Asiatic Society. 78 (1 (288)). Malaysian Branch of the Royal Asiatic Society: 37–58. ISSN 2180-4338. JSTOR 41493537.
- War Office (1887). Treatise on Ammunition (Report). London: Harrison and Sons.
- Weller, Donald M. (August 1954a). "Salvo – Splash! (Part I): The Development Of Naval Gunfire Support In World War II". Proceedings. 80 (8). U.S. Naval Institute.
- Weller, Donald M. (September 1954b). "Salvo – Splash! (Part II): The Development Of Naval Gunfire Support In World War II". Proceedings. 80 (9). U.S. Naval Institute.
- Whitley, M. J. (1995). Cruisers of World War Two. Brockhampton Press. ISBN 978-1-86019-874-8.
- Wilson, H. W. (1896). Ironclads in Action: A Sketch of Naval Warfare From 1855 to 1895. Vol. 1. Boston: Little, Brown.
- Zorlu, Tuncay (2008). Innovation and Empire in Turkey: Sultan Selim III and the Modernisation of the Ottoman Navy. I. B. Tauris. ISBN 978-1-84511-694-1.
