= BL 12-inch Mk X naval gun =

BL 12-inch gun Mk X
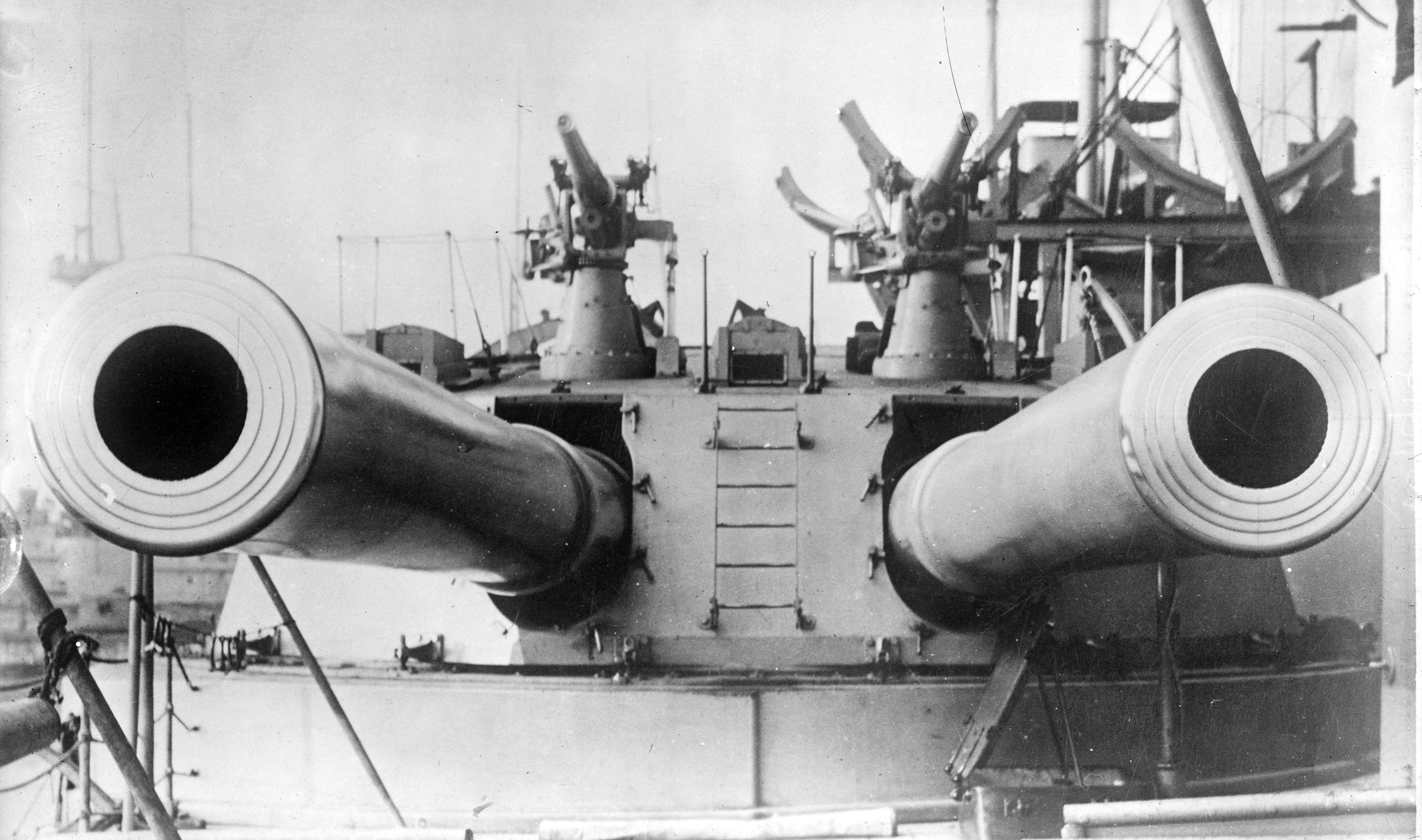
- On HMS Dreadnought
- Type: Naval gun
- Place of origin: United Kingdom

Service history
- In service: 1906 – 1923
- Wars: World War I

Production history
- Designer: Vickers
- Manufacturer: Vickers
- Unit cost: £9800 (1907)

Specifications
- Mass: 57 tons barrel & breech
- Barrel length: 45 feet (13.72 m) bore (45 cal)
- Shell: 850 pounds (385.6 kg) Lyddite, Armour-piercing, Shrapnel
- Calibre: 12 inches (304.8 mm)
- Breech: Welin interrupted screw
- Muzzle velocity: 2,700 ft/s (823 m/s)
- Maximum firing range: 22,860 m (25,000 yd)

The BL 12 inch Gun Mark X (Note: Mark X = Mark 10. Succeeding versions were Mark XI (11) and XII (12). Britain used Roman numerals to denote Marks (models) of ordnance until after World War II) was a British 45-calibre naval gun which was mounted as primary armament on battleships and battlecruisers from 1906. It first appeared on HMS Dreadnought.

== History ==
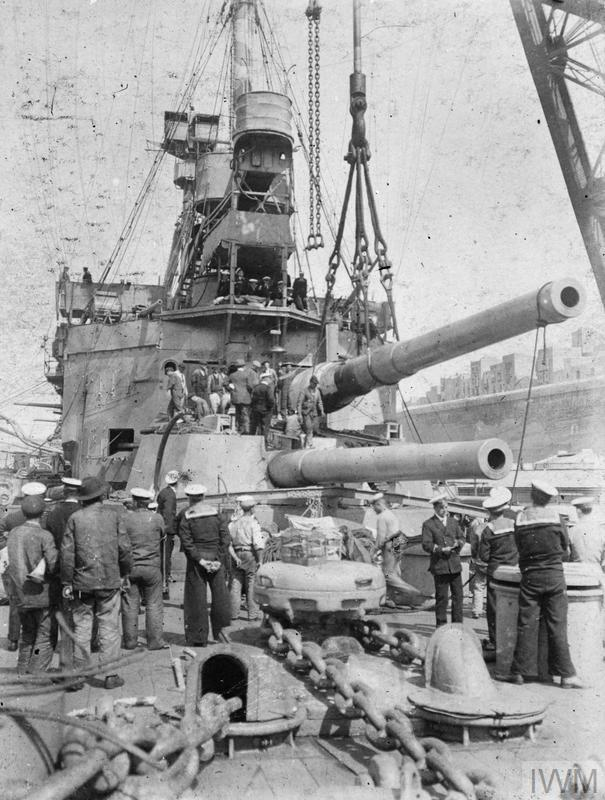
HMS Agamemnon has her guns replaced during a refit at Malta in May–June 1915

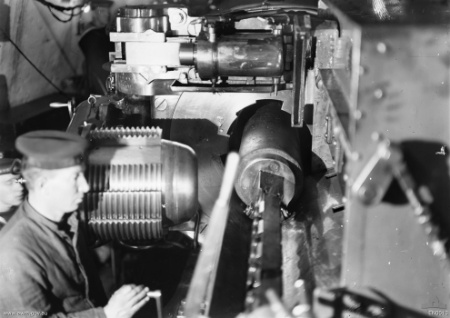
Ramming shell on HMAS Australia, December 1918

The Mk X continued the trend of lengthening gun barrels as far as new construction methods would permit, in order to allow more cordite propellant to be used to attain higher projectile velocities. The Mk X increased the bore length from the Mk IX's 480 to 540 in (12 to 14 metres), increasing muzzle velocity from 2,600 to 2,700 ft/s (790 to 820 m/s).

Subsequent British attempts to further increase the power of 12-inch guns led to failure with the 50-calibre Mk XI and Mk XII guns; the Mk X was the last successful 12-inch British gun.

=== Naval use ===
Mk X guns were mounted in the following ships which served throughout World War I:

- Lord Nelson-class battleships, laid down 1905, completed 1908
- Battleship HMS Dreadnought, laid down 1905, completed 1906
- Invincible-class battlecruisers, laid down 1906, completed 1908–1909
- Bellerophon-class battleships, laid down 1906, completed 1909
- Indefatigable-class battlecruisers, laid down 1909, completed 1911–1913

=== World War I use ashore ===
From 1917 several Mk X guns were deployed ashore on the section of the Belgian coast still held by the Allies, near Nieuwpoort. They were part of the "Royal Naval Siege Guns" under the command of Admiral Sir Reginald Bacon, and were used for attacking German heavy gun batteries.

== Ammunition ==
65 lb Cordite Cartridge ¼ charge : i.e. 4 such cartridges were normally loaded to fire the gun	Mk VIIA Common Pointed shell with Cap (CPC) filled with gunpowder, 1912	World War I Shells. Left to Right : Mk XA Capped Armour-Piercing shell filled with Trotyl (TNT); Shrapnel; Mk 6A Capped Common pointed shell filled with Shellite 70/30

== See also ==
- List of naval guns

=== Weapons of comparable role, performance and era ===
- 305mm/45 Modèle 1906 gun French equivalent
- EOC 12 inch /45 naval gun Elswick Ordnance Company equivalent
- 12"/45 caliber Mark 5 gun US equivalent

== Bibliography ==
- "Range Tables for His Majesty's Fleet, 1910. February, 1911"
- Treatise on Ammunition, 1915
