= Treatise on Ammunition =

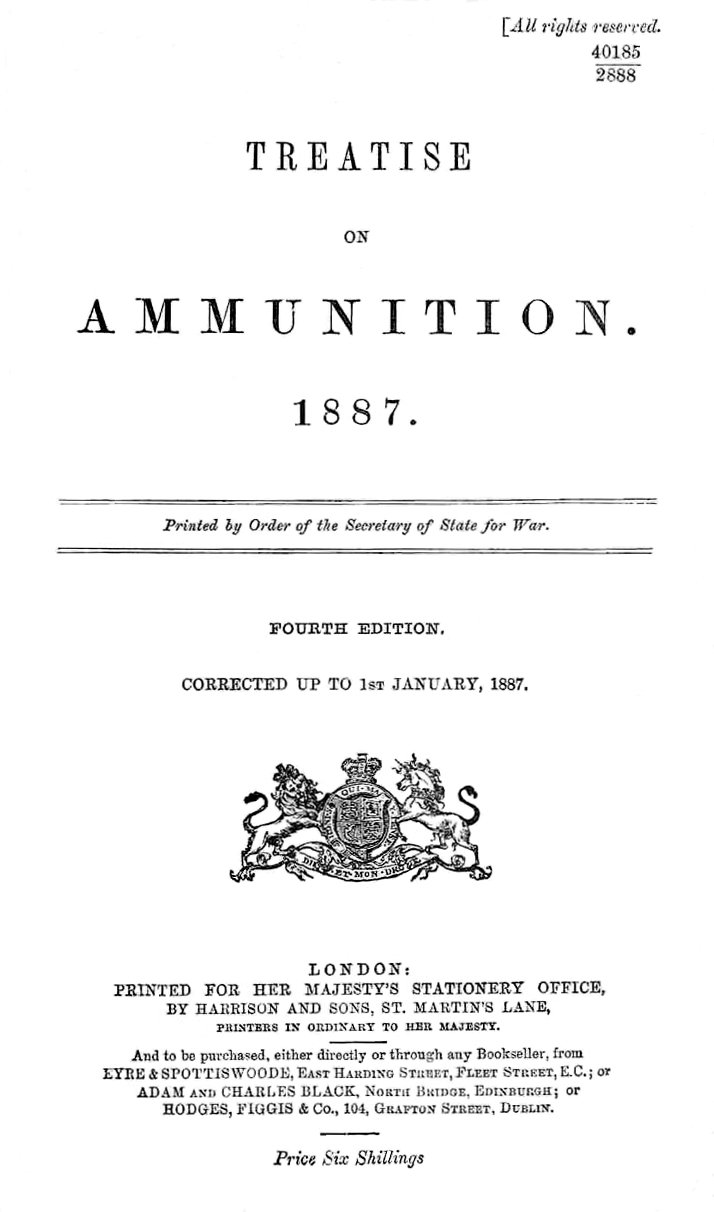
Title page of the 4th Edition, 1887

Treatise on Ammunition, from 1926 retitled Text Book of Ammunition, is a series of manuals detailing all British Empire military and naval service ammunition and associated equipment in use at the date of publication. It was published by the War Office at approximate 5 year intervals. As the guns are listed for which the ammunition can be used, the Treatise also constitutes a list of guns in service at the publication date.

Its predecessor was Ammunition: A Descriptive Treatise on the Different Projectiles, Charges, Fuzes, Rockets, &c., at Present in Use for Land and Sea Service, and on Other War Stores Manufactured in the Royal Laboratory of 1867.

The editions contain diagrams, measurements, storage and transportation instructions useful to officers involved in storage, transport and firing of ammunition. It is an important primary source of information for military historians researching the types and capabilities of ammunition available to the British military at the time of various conflicts, and for collectors wishing to identify artefacts. However, the individual editions lack historical context, in that they omit dates and rationales for particular types and Marks of ammunition being added to or removed from the inventory.

The editions are notable for the many pages of colour lithographs of cartridges, shells and fuzes by Harrison & Sons and later by Malby & Sons.

From the 1926 edition onwards it was renamed Text Book of Ammunition.

The best known editions are the 10th, accurate as at August 1, 1914 and published in 1915 which constitutes a definitive description of the ammunition with which Britain began World War I, and the 1936 edition which lists the ammunition with which Britain entered World War II. These and other editions are available as modern facsimile reprints.

== Editions ==
- 1st, published 1873. Lithographs by Harrison & Sons.
- 2nd, 1877 edition. Corrected up to December 1877. Published 1878
- 3rd, as at November 1881.
- 4th, published 1887. Lithographs by Dangerfield, Covent Garden
- 5th, published 1894. Lithographs by Wyman & Sons Ltd.
- 6th, published 1897
- 7th, published 1902. Lithographs by Weller & Graham Ltd.
- 8th, dated 1 September 1905. Published 1906. Lithographs by Weller & Graham Ltd.
- 9th, published 1911
- 10th, dated 1 August 1914. Published 1915. Lithographs by Malby & Sons.
- 11th, published 1922. Lithographs by Malby & Sons.
- Published 1926
- Published 1936. As at 29 May.
- Published 1944
