= Mount Brock =

Mountain in Alberta, Canada

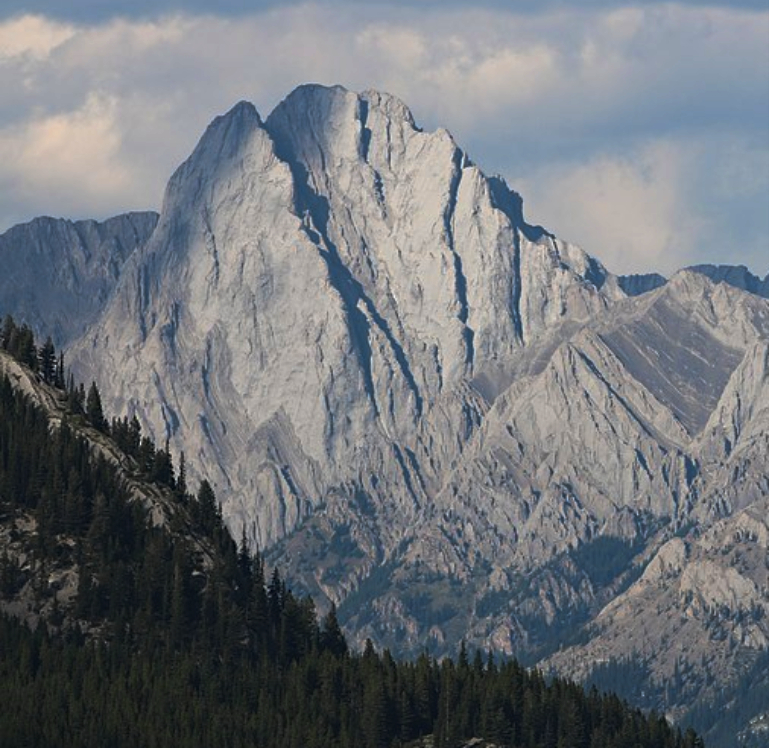
- Mount Brock, west face showing

Highest point
- Elevation: 2,902 m (9,521 ft)
- Prominence: 205 m (673 ft)
- Parent peak: Mount Evan-Thomas (3097 m)
- Listing: Mountains of Alberta
- Coordinates: 50°44′15″N 115°04′53″W

Geography
- Location within Alberta Location within Canada
- Country: Canada
- Province: Alberta
- Protected area: Kananaskis Country
- Parent range: Opal Range; Canadian Rockies
- Topo map: NTS 82J11 Kananaskis Lakes

Geology
- Rock age: Cambrian
- Rock type: Limestone

Climbing
- First ascent: 1955 by P.J.B. Duffy, G. Hohnson, D. Kennedy, F. Koch

Mount Brock is a 2,902-metre (9,521-foot) mountain summit located in the Opal Range of the Canadian Rockies of Alberta, Canada. Its nearest higher peak is Mount Evan-Thomas, 3.3 km (2.1 mi) to the north.

Like so many of the mountains in Kananaskis Country, Mount Brock received its name from the persons and ships involved in the 1916 Battle of Jutland, the only major sea battle of the First World War.

== History ==
The mountain was named in honor of Rear Admiral Osmond de Beauvoir Brock (1869-1947), who served on HMS Princess Royal during the Battle of Jutland in World War I.

The mountain's name was made official in 1922 by the Geographical Names Board of Canada.

The first ascent of the peak was made in 1954 by P.J.B. Duffy, and K. Ingold.

== Geology ==
Mount Brock is composed of sedimentary rock laid down during the Precambrian to Jurassic periods. Formed in shallow seas, this sedimentary rock was pushed east and over the top of younger rock during the Laramide orogeny.

== Climate ==
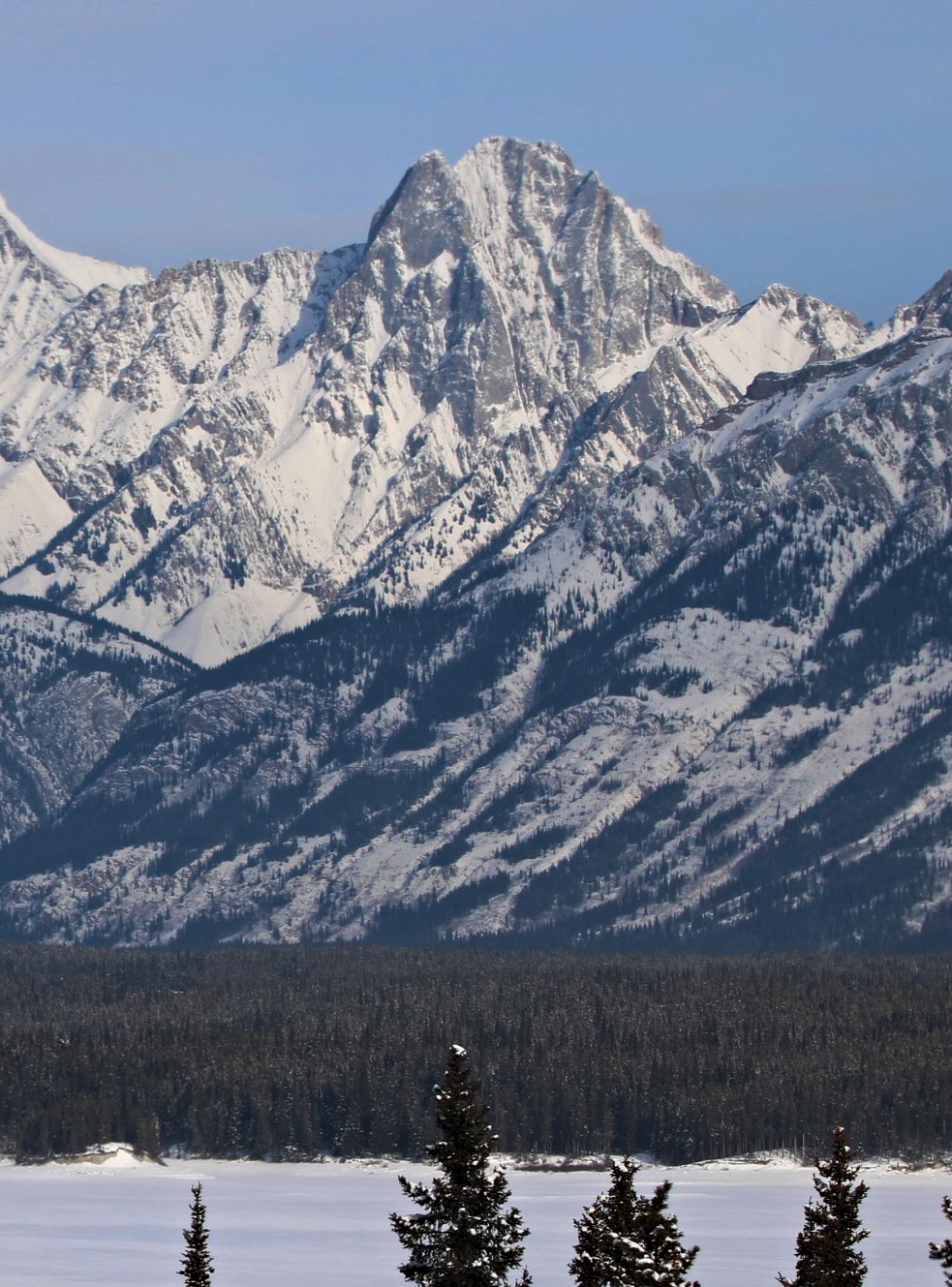

Based on the Köppen climate classification, Mount Brock is located in a subarctic climate with cold, snowy winters, and mild summers. Temperatures can drop below −20 C with wind chill factors below −30 C.

In terms of favorable weather, June through September are the best months to climb Mount Brock.

Precipitation runoff from the west side of the mountain drains into the Kananaskis River, the east side drains into tributaries of the Elbow River, and then both of these merge into the Bow River, and finally into the Saskatchewan River.

== See also ==
- List of mountains in the Canadian Rockies
