= Hugh Evan-Thomas =

Royal Navy Admiral (1862–1928)

Admiral Sir Hugh Evan-Thomas GCB KCMG MVO
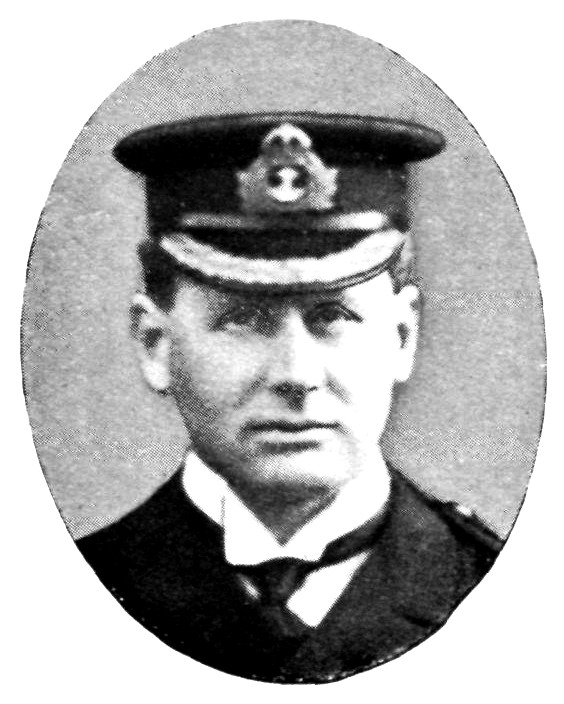
- H. Evan-Thomas
- Born: 27 October 1862; Gnoll, Neath, Glamorgan
- Died: 30 August 1928 (aged 65); Cople, Bedfordshire
- Relatives: Charles Evan-Thomas (nephew)
- Military career
- Allegiance: United Kingdom
- Branch: Royal Navy
- Service years: 1877–1924
- Rank: Admiral
- Nickname: Old Voice
- Commands: Portsmouth Signal School; HMS Pioneer; HMS Majestic; HMS Caesar; HMS Enchantress; HMS Bellerophon; Royal Naval College, Dartmouth; 5th Battle Squadron; Nore Command
- Conflicts: Battle of Jutland (31 May – 1 June 1916)
- Awards: Knight Grand Cross of the Order of the Bath; Member of the Royal Victorian Order; KCMG

Admiral Sir Hugh Evan-Thomas, GCB, KCMG, MVO (27 October 1862 – 30 August 1928) was a British Royal Navy officer.

During World War I he commanded the 5th Battle Squadron of the Grand Fleet, flying his flag in HMS Barham, and fought at the Battle of Jutland on 31 May – 1 June 1916.

== Background ==
Evan-Thomas' family came from Wales, where they had owned the Llwynmadoc estate near Beulah, Powys, for two hundred years. The family also owned the Gnoll at Neath in Glamorgan and Pencerrig at Builth Wells, but nonetheless suffered a shortage of money to support their seven children in the style they might have wished. Evan-Thomas had to rely upon his own salary rather than family money to support himself through his life.

Hugh Evan-Thomas was born the son of Charles Evan-Thomas, who was High Sheriff of Brecknockshire for 1885 and died at Cople in Bedfordshire aged 65 on 30 August 1928. A memorial service was held at Eglwys Oen Duw church in Llwynmadoc, Wales. A brass plaque in the church records his death. A year later, the council of Neath, Glamorgan, purchased the Gnoll estate where Evan-Thomas was born to serve as a public park, where a war memorial would be erected. Jellicoe wrote a tribute to Evan-Thomas saying, 'If I had one loyal and splendid supporter during the Great War in the Grand Fleet, one who never failed me, one who led his ships magnificently, and not only led them magnificently but brought them to a pitch of efficiency that was a pattern for the whole of the Grand fleet, It was Admiral Sir Hugh Evan-Thomas'.

== Early career ==
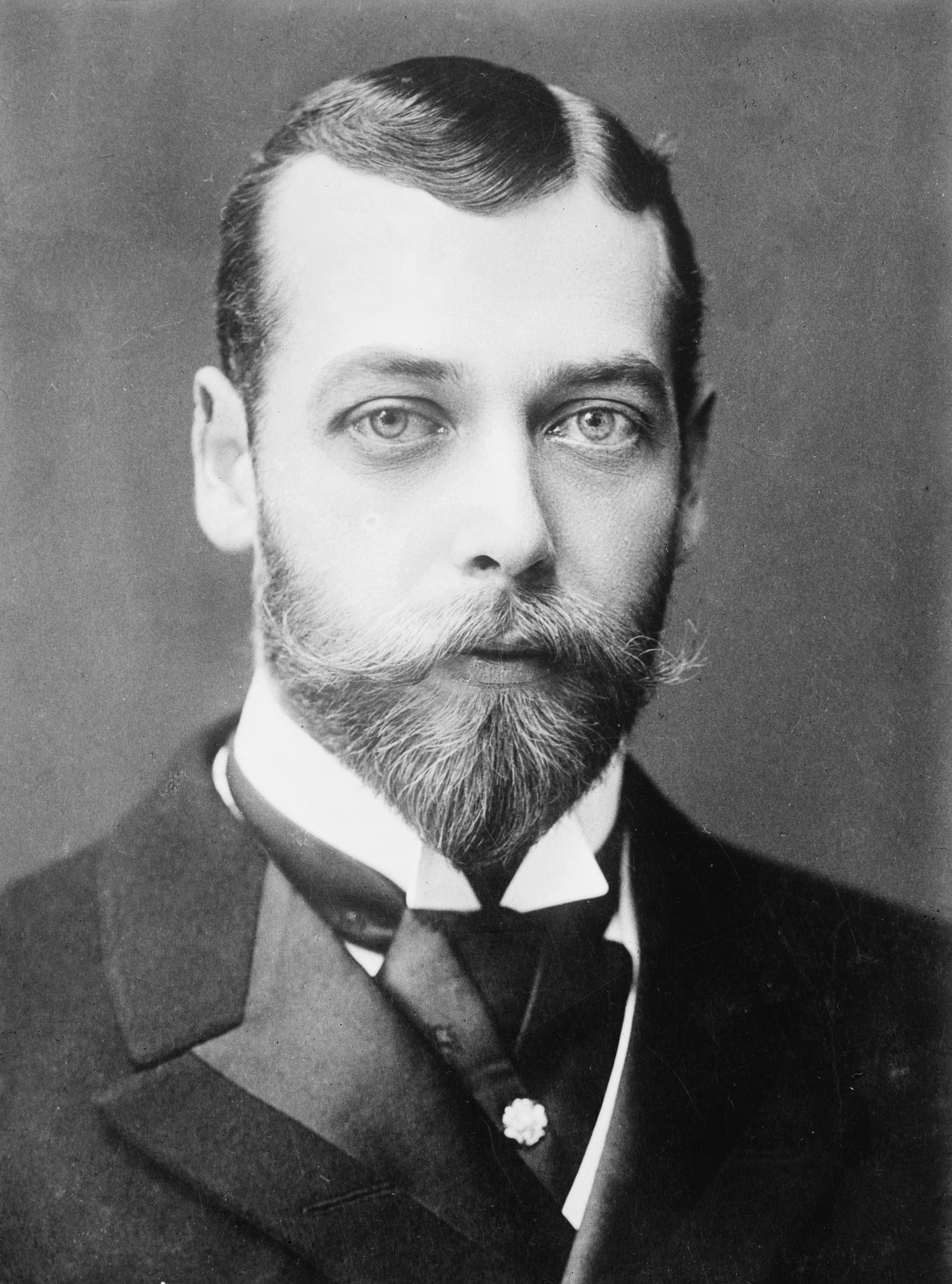
Prince George in 1893

In 1877, at the age of 15, Hugh Thomas was a naval cadet on the training ship HMS Britannia. In September, the royal princes George Frederick and his elder brother, Prince Albert Victor, Duke of Clarence, both joined the ship as part of their education. The princes' tutor, John Neale Dalton, who accompanied them, approved of Thomas and permitted him to become friends with the boys. Thomas left Britannia in December 1877, but not before a friendship was established. George sent him a Christmas card (from 'Sprat', while Albert was 'herring' and Thomas 'Old Voice'), both wrote letters and Dalton wrote to Thomas requesting that he write back and remain in contact.

In February 1878, Thomas was posted to the barque-rigged battery ship HMS Swiftsure, which was part of the Mediterranean Fleet commanded by Sir Geoffrey Phipps Hornby. Thomas' father, Charles Evan Thomas, changed the family name from Thomas to Evan-Thomas. Thomas' report from the ship's captain, Nowell Salmon, reported that Midshipman Evan-Thomas had "conducted himself with sobriety zeal & attention & to my satisfaction". Swiftsure was stationed in the Gulf of Saros off Gallipoli in July 1878 when Evan-Thomas and another officer were ashore and were arrested by Russian soldiers. The matter was shortly resolved and the men released, but was a reflection of continuing tension in the area just after signing of the treaty of Berlin.

In August 1878, Evan-Thomas transferred to the barque-rigged turret ship, HMS Monarch, captained by Algernon Lyons, who was his first cousin once removed. Lyons reported he "conducted himself with sobriety and entirely to my satisfaction", but his successor as captain of Monarch, George Tryon, described him as "a very promising young officer in every respect".

== Royal duties ==
In 1879, Evan-Thomas was chosen to join HMS Bacchante, as part of a crew hand-picked to be a good influences on the two princes who now continued their naval careers on the ship. Bacchante made three cruises: the first to the Mediterranean and West Indies, the second to Spain and Ireland, and the third a round-world trip. The third cruise departed South Railway Jetty in September 1880 in the company of three other corvettes and the frigate HMS Inconstant. The planned itinerary was interrupted by the first Boer War, causing consternation for Queen Victoria that her grandsons were now in a war zone. However, the ship was not involved in action and royal activities were limited to visits to Zulu chief Cetshwayo and other social functions. A more serious danger to the ship occurred in a storm off Western Australia, where the rudder was damaged and the ship could only be brought safely under control by sending men aloft so that their bodies acted as makeshift sails to turn the ship. Evan-Thomas was one of the few people allowed to socialise with the princes. In June 1881, he became senior midshipman and their regular companion on trips ashore. These included trips for riding, shooting, visits to gold mines and other sightseeing locations, and a visit from the Emperor in Japan. In spring 1882, Baccante returned to the Mediterranean via the Suez Canal and stopped to visit the princes' uncle, King George I of Greece. On 6 June 1882, Evan-Thomas departed the ship to return home, having been promoted to sub-lieutenant.

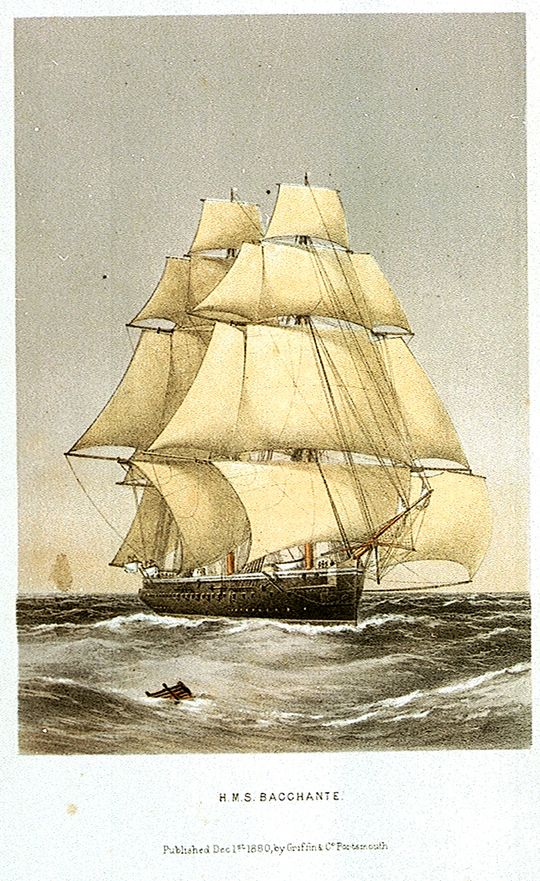
HMS Bacchante

Evan-Thomas spent seven months at the Royal Naval College, Greenwich, on a lieutenants training course, where he became friendly with Lieutenant John Jellicoe (later first sea lord and commander of the British fleet during World War I). He then attended a gunnery course at HMS Excellent, then commanded by John Fisher. Evan-Thomas continued to write to the princes during 1883, visiting Prince Edward at Sandringham and at Trinity college (George was at sea). In 1883, he was promoted to Lieutenant; Prince George wrote congratulating him and observing that his father had been pressing the lords of the admiralty for the promotion. Prince Edward wrote, mentioning that he had suggested to Lord Alcester that Evan-Thomas would like a posting to HMS Sultan, while Dalton persuaded the Prince of Wales to recommend Evan-Thomas for a posting to the Royal yacht. The first naval lord, Astley Cooper Key, declined the princes' recommendation, proposing his own son for the Royal yacht instead. However, he did obtain the posting to Sultan, where he served for 31 months until an illness forced his return to England on half pay for six months. Sultan had three captains during his time aboard, the last, Richard King, describing him as 'a thorough seaman and most efficient officer in every way. Active and zealous.'

Thomas now took up a posting to HMS Bellerophon as flag-lieutenant to his cousin, Rear Admiral Sir Algernon Lyons, something that had been arranged before his illness. A letter to Prince George noted that he was still not fully recovered, hoping that the climate in Bermuda would be good for him. He remained on Bellerophon for nine months, before returning to England for ten months, again on half pay for health reasons. In August 1888, he was sent to the sail training ship HMS St Vincent, from which home leave was possible and he assisted in his father's election campaign to the local council. In spring 1889, he attended Excellent for a gunnery course, and then Vernon for torpedo training. Prince George also attended at the same time. In 1889, he served briefly on HMS Camperdown, before a permanent posting to her in December when she sailed to the Mediterranean as flagship to Vice Admiral Sir Anthony Hiley Hoskins. In May 1890, the ship was 'swapped' for HMS Victoria, which had been intended to serve as flagship, but whose construction had been delayed. The crews of the two ships changed places, with Camperdown returning to the Channel Fleet. Hoskins was impressed with Evan-Thomas' performance, placing him in charge of arrangements for refloating Victoria after she ran aground in the Gulf of Corinth in February 1891. Hoskins was in the habit of leaving the bridge during manoeuvres, so that his junior officers would get a chance acting as admiral to complete them.

On 14 January 1892, a telegram arrived on Victoria advising of the death of Prince Edward, and as officer of the watch, Evan-Thomas was responsible for ordering flags to half mast. A few weeks later, he was transferred to the royal yacht HMY Osborne at Prince George's request. The ship was unready for sea due to problems with supplying boilers, leaving Thomas with little to do. George, however, received command of HMS Melampus. Prince George had received rapid promotions and was thus commander of the ship with much less experience than would normally be the case. In such circumstances, it was normal to appoint an older officer as first lieutenant, but instead the post went to Evan-Thomas. Other officers were also selected from friends of the prince. As a new ship, Melampus was commissioned in June 1892, proceeded to trials off Ireland and then took part in the Cowes week naval review. The ship received creditable reports, and Evan-Thomas was commended in the admiralty formal report for his part in preparing the ship. The ship's company was then disbanded, with Evan-Thomas returning to duties on Osborne, captained by Archibald Berkeley Milne.

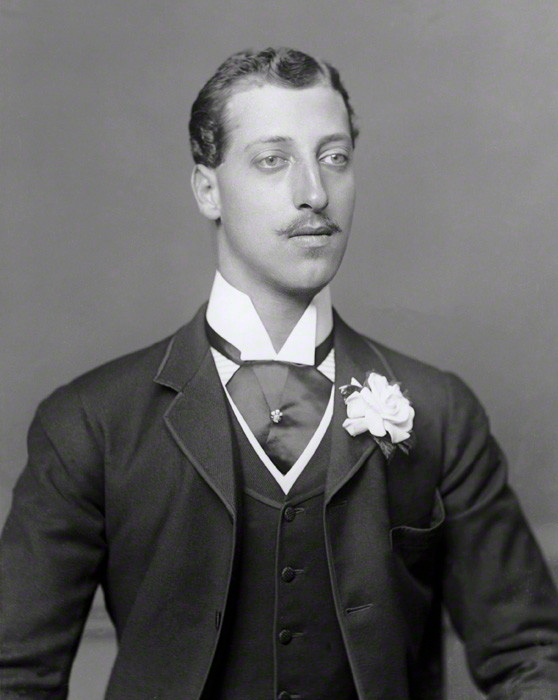
Prince Albert Victor c.1885

Osborne remained out of service throughout 1892, giving Evan-Thomas plenty of time for shore leave. In February 1893, Osborne sailed for Genoa where they met Prince George, his mother and sisters for a royal tour of the Mediterranean. Evan Thomas, with other officers, frequently accompanied the royal party ashore. In a relatively small ship he was required to stand sea watches, but also had direct responsibility for all details of ensuring royal life ran smoothly. The ship returned to England on 3 June. Milne reported he was 'a zealous and hardworking officer and in every way to my satisfaction'.

== Mediterranean Squadron ==
On 22 June 1893, the flagship of the Mediterranean fleet, HMS Victoria, collided with HMS Camperdown, resulting in serious damage to Camperdown, but the sinking of Victoria with the loss of 358 lives. Vice-Admiral George Tryon, who had ordered the manoeuvre which resulted in the collision, was amongst those who drowned. It became necessary to find a replacement as commander of the squadron, and Admiral Sir Michael Culme-Seymour, 3rd Baronet, was appointed. Culme-Seymour first acquired as secretary Staff Paymaster Henry Rickard, formerly secretary to Admiral of the fleet Prince Alfred, who had just ceased to be commander in chief of Plymouth. Culme-Seymour next telegraphed to Evan-Thomas, requesting that he would take the post of flag-lieutenant. Evan-Thomas hesitated, because the post was at least on paper less than a lieutenant of his seniority might expect. However, the request was endorsed by Admiral Lord Clanwilliam, and also the first sea lord, Sir Anthony Hoskins. Evan-Thomas went to see both admirals who assured him he had been chosen on merit, as it was felt that under the circumstances the best man possible was required for the post.

Culme-Seymour was concerned to restore the efficiency of his squadron, in particular through exercises to build the confidence of his ships' captains that they could work together effectively and without further mishaps. Evan-Thomas gained considerable experience in working with a fleet, and in particular a comprehensive knowledge of the signal book. Control of a fleet at this time was by a system of flag signals from the command ship, which had to be read and obeyed by other ships. The signal book had grown to contain thousands of flag combinations to give detailed instructions, and controversy had arisen within the navy whether this system would be practical in battle. Tryon had been an advocate of a much simpler system, where captains had greater latitude simply to 'follow the leader' and use their own initiative rather than waiting for explicit orders. Ironically, the ship collision had happened during manoeuvres using the traditional system, not when captains were supposed to be acting independently, and had they used initiative rather than following incorrect flag commands, the accident could have been avoided. Nonetheless, a perception arose that the simplified system giving more independence to captains was somehow to blame, and the navy as a whole moved back to detailed flag instructions. Evan-Thomas at the centre of this reversal of policy in the Mediterranean squadron, gained an expectation for accurate and detailed flag commands which contributed to later difficulties at the Battle of Jutland, where signal failures contributed to the loss of British ships. Other experiments continued to try to improve the effectiveness of communication between ships, including semaphore, searchlight and carrier pigeon.

Evan-Thomas continued to suffer from illness while in the Mediterranean, and in 1894 received sick leave to return to England. While he was indeed ill, the leave was also granted to allow him to formally propose to and marry Hilda Barnard, who he had intended to marry immediately before his unexpected posting to the Mediterranean. The wedding took place on 18 July 1894 at St. Saviours Church, Walton Place, Knightsbridge. In November the couple moved to Valletta on Malta where the fleet was based. Social life on Malta remained impressive, with royalty and other dignitaries stopping at Malta and being entertained at Admiralty House. Evan-Thomas' term in the Mediterranean ceased in December 1896. Culme-Seymour wrote that 'he has great tact and judgement – a thorough knowledge of his duties (signal and otherwise) and both with the fleet in the summer at sea and on shore in Malta has been all that I could wish'. On 1 January 1897, he was promoted to commander.

Evan-Thomas became secretary to an admiralty committee set up to revise the signal book. In May 1898 he was present with a number of senior officers to witness an experimental wireless transmission from a wooden hut, on a clifftop on the Isle of wight, where Guglielmo Marconi had set up a wireless transmitter. A similar station had been set up at Bournemouth, some fourteen miles away. Afterwards Evan-Thomas wrote to Vice-Admiral sir Compton Domville, chairman of the signals committee, reporting the success of the experiment, and recommending a trial on board two warships. The battleship HMS Alexandra and cruisers HMS Europa and HMS Juno were each equipped with radios for the 1899 manoeuvres, and transmitted messages up to 60 miles.

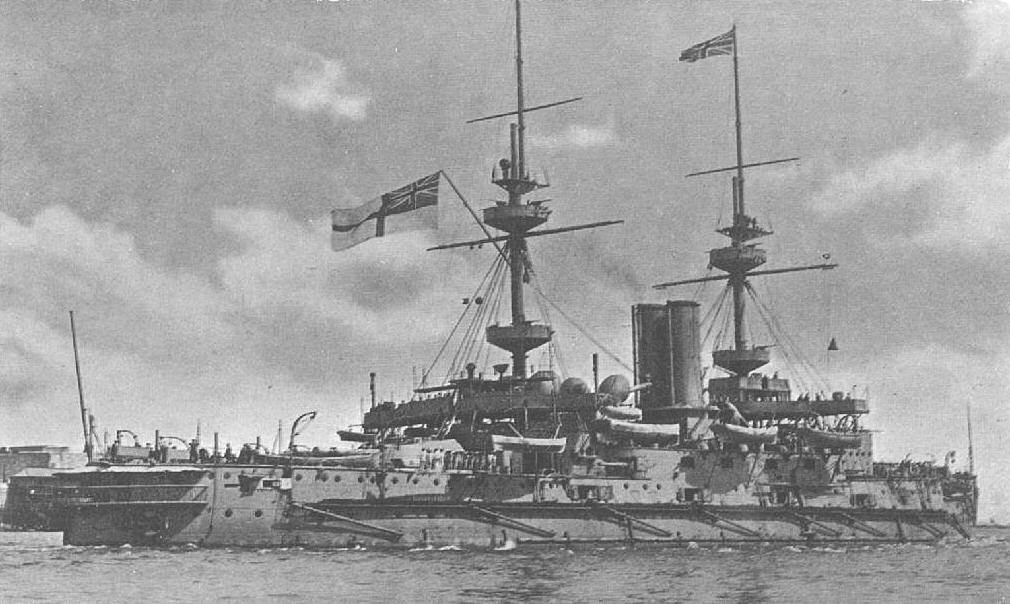
HMS Majestic

Work on the signal book was completed in 1898 and a new version published. In November, Evan-Thomas became commander of the Portsmouth Signal School. HMS Victory was still officially flagship at Portsmouth, and so Evan-Thomas was recorded as part of her crew. Culme-Seymour had already been appointed commander of Portsmouth and took with him a number of other officers from the Mediterranean, so the posting was effectively a reunion. Once again, Culme-Seymour held regular dinner parties for VIPs, including Prince George and naval dignitaries, which Evan-Thomas attended.

In November 1900, Evan-Thomas was appointed to his first independent command, the cruiser HMS Pioneer, which was part of the Mediterranean fleet, at age 38. The fleet was now commanded by Admiral John Fisher. After two years he was promoted to captain on 26 June 1902, and again transferred to HMS Victory for service at the Admiralty. The following year he was chosen as flag captain for Vice-Admiral Lord Charles Beresford in the channel squadron, commanding HMS Majestic 1903–1904 and HMS Caesar 1904–1905. Beresford was acquainted with Evan-Thomas before the appointment, having sought advice from him on the new signal book when himself appointed second in command of the Mediterranean squadron in January 1900. Evan-Thomas was his second choice when he could not get Captain Percy Scott.

When Beresford departed as commander of the channel fleet he commented, I 'heartily give you all the credit you so richly deserve for making Caesar the most brilliantly smart ship on the water', and 'you are certain of a most brilliant career in the service and are sure to become one of Britain's most efficient admirals'. Evan-Thomas was now also in a position to himself assist other officers up the career ladder, and received formal thanks from Commander Michael Culme-Seymour, son of his previous commander, for help in obtaining promotion. A note from Lord Knollys to Beresford commended Evan-Thomas for good results in gunnery trials.

== Service at the Admiralty ==
In 1905 Evan-Thomas became captain of the yacht HMS Enchantress, which was reserved for the Board of Admiralty. Shortly afterwards he became Private Secretary to the First Lord of the Admiralty, and served as such to Lord Cawdor, Lord Tweedsmouth and Reginald McKenna. This was the period when John Fisher was First Sea Lord, and considerable changes were taking place in the composition of the navy. Although on good terms with his former commander Beresford, he also maintained a good working relationship with Fisher, despite the growing public feud between the two admirals.

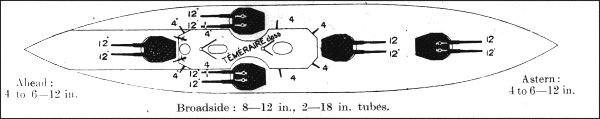
layout of Dreadnought battleship HMS Bellerophon

In 1908 he returned to sea in command of the new dreadnought battleship HMS Bellerophon, the second of the new class of ships being created by Fisher. Bellerophon joined the Home Fleet commanded by Admiral Sir William May, who had once been Evan-Thomas' commander when onboard Ramillies. During fleet exercise in 1909, Bellerophon was given the task of 'fast scout', for the red fleet. On one day, she detected a group of four cruisers from the opposing red fleet, and was duly deemed to have sunk them, to the congratulations of all, including newspapers reporting the events. However, the next day trying to repeat the coup, Bellerophon instead emerged from mist to find six opposing battleships. This was the end of the exercise for Evan-Thomas. In April 1910, Bellerophon played host to trials of a new 'director firing system' devised by Percy Scott. The intention of the system was to control all main guns on the ship together, from a vantage point high on the ship, where an enemy could best be seen. Firing all guns simultaneously meant that the shells would fall at the same time, and the position of the splashes compared to an enemy vessel would give a good idea of how to correct the aim for the next shot. Evan-Thomas was not impressed by the system, which ultimately proved essential in extending the range at which effective attacks on an enemy could be made. At the time, conventional wisdom in the fleet suggested a range of 8,000 yards was a reasonable distance to open fire, but in the forthcoming war, successful actions took place at more than twice this range, with the advantage going to the side who could fire accurately first.

In November 1909 Evan-Thomas was offered the position of captain of the fleet in the Home Fleet. Instead, in July 1910, he accepted command of the Royal Naval College at Dartmouth. It was intended that the two princes, Edward and Albert would attend the college, as their father (now King George V) had done. Fisher observed that the service would benefit from Evan-Thomas' time at the college, and it would be a favour to the king, but would not otherwise help his career. In February 1911 the college was struck by measles, causing the princes to be moved to Evan-Thomas' own home until the outbreak was over. Both caught the illness, but survived, while one cadet who died. Edward, now Prince of Wales, left the college in March to go on to a posting at sea.

A second incident occurred when the king was expected to visit to unveil a statue of himself. A rumour spread about the school that someone intended to deface the statue just before the visit. Evan-Thomas attempted to prevent this by setting the staff on guard over the statue all night. The staff, being civilians, refused, and Evan-Thomas sacked them. Matters got into the press and the visit was cancelled, although this coincided with the national strike and the matter disappeared from public attention. In July 1912 Evan-Thomas was promoted to Rear-Admiral by seniority. He served on a committee, went on a training course, and then awaited a new command on half pay. In December 1913 he was appointed second in command of the 1st Battle Squadron of the Home Fleets. Whether this appointment was encouraged by the king is uncertain, although royal intervention was certainly used to assist other naval officers at this time. Evan-Thomas record of achievement was sufficient in its own right to merit the appointment.

== World War I ==
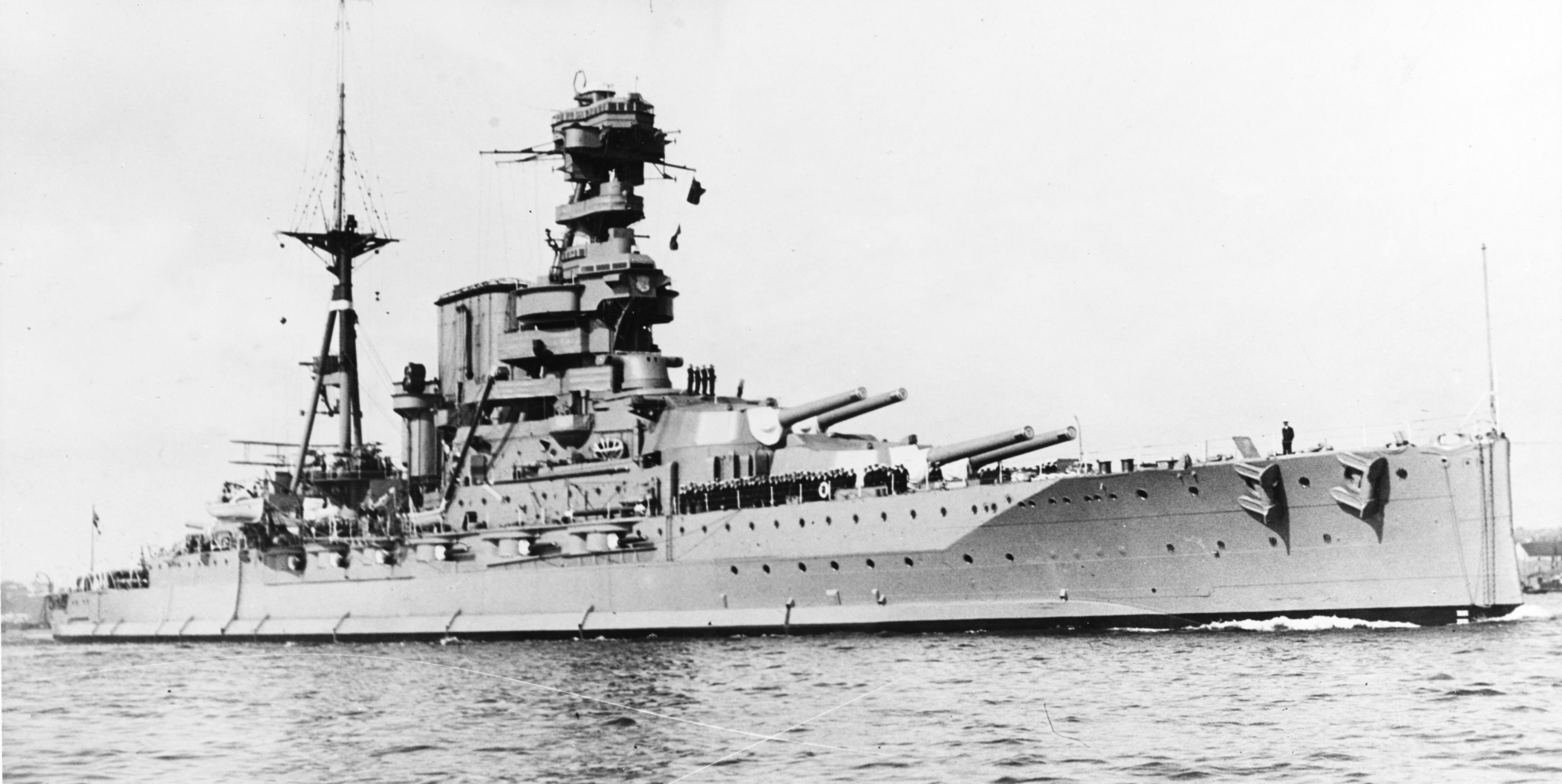
HMS Barham, flagship of the 5th Battle Squadron at Jutland, after its modernization, mid-1930s

Evan-Thomas' next appointment in October 1915 was as commander of the 5th Battle Squadron, which consisted of the five newly completed Queen Elizabeth-class fast battleships, arguably the most powerful ships afloat at that time. HMS Barham was chosen as flagship for the admiral. The 15 inch gun ships, capable of 24 knots, formed a fast division attached to the Grand Fleet, complementing the fast battlecruiser squadron which normally served in a detached scouting role. The posting was considered prestigious. It is likely that the choice of Evan-Thomas for the post was influenced by his previous friendship with Admiral Jellicoe, commander of the Grand Fleet but also by Jellicoe's concerns not to appoint an officer to the post who might be too independent of mind. The appointment was likely also to be acceptable to Admiral Beatty, commanding the battlecruisers, since he had seniority over Evan-Thomas and would command in any joint operation. Although the Queen Elizabeths were slightly slower than the battlecruisers, Beatty continued for some time to campaign that they should be permanently attached to his command as the fast division of the fleet.

On 12 May 1916, a meeting took place at Rosyth between Jellicoe, Beatty and First Sea Lord Jackson to discuss the future of the battlecruiser fleet. Australia was out of action following a collision with New Zealand, while it was decided that the three ships of the 3rd Battle Cruiser Squadron should be sent to Scapa Flow to practice gunnery, following reports of poor gunnery for all the battlecruisers, at least partly due to the lack of a practice range at Rosyth. It was decided that the 5th Battle Squadron (BS) would be temporarily attached to the battlecruisers to make up their numbers. Although the battlecruisers used different standing orders to the Grand fleet, Beatty did not meet with Evan-Thomas, nor send him copies of their standing orders. This was to become an issue later, when the ships took part as one unit in the Battle of Jutland.

Intelligence was received by the Admiralty in the form of intercepted radio signals that the German High Seas Fleet intended to put to sea on the morning of 30 May. At 5.0 pm on 30 May, Jellicoe was ordered to raise steam, and passed on the command to Beatty. At around 10 pm the battlecruisers left Rosyth to meet the Grand Fleet coming from Scapa Flow at a point in the North Sea some 100 miles from Denmark at 2.0 pm the following day. Such alerts had happened before, and it was not considered likely that a major fleet action was about to take place. The battlecruisers were ordered to travel to a point south of the meeting point, then turn north. Beatty arranged his ships with his own 1st Battlecruiser Squadron (BCS) in the most southerly position (sailing broadly east), with the 2nd BCS on a parallel course two miles north and the 5th BS five miles astern.

The ships reached their scouting position south of the rendezvous and Beatty issued orders to turn to the north. The turn resulted in the 5th Battle Squadron leading the ships in a generally northerly direction, the intention being that it would arrive properly placed to take up its assigned position at the meeting with the Grand Fleet. Outlying cruisers screening the main ships now made contact with a German force to the south east, which meant because of the just completed turn the British ships were heading away from the enemy. Beatty hoisted a flag signal for his ships to turn to a new course SSE, which both battlecruiser squadrons did. Confusion ensued in the 5BS, which could see that a signal had been made but could not read it across the greater distance, and these ships continued north. Before the first northerly turn HMS Tiger, the last ship in Beatty's squadron, had been successfully relaying messages to the 5BS by searchlight, but Tiger was now furthest away from Evan-Thomas and no other ship took on the duty. Eventually it became apparent that the main squadron had turned south and the 5BS followed, but by now the gap between the two groups had grown to ten miles.

Beatty proceeded directly to engage the German ships, which were identified as the squadron of five battlecruisers commanded by Admiral Franz von Hipper. The German ships opened fire first at around 3.45 pm, with more accurate fire than the six British battlecruisers could achieve. Beatty's flagship Lion was struck by a shell on Q turret, causing a serious explosion but not before the magazines had been flooded, thereby saving the ship. Indefatigable was struck similarly at about 4.02 pm and exploded entirely, leaving only two survivors from her crew of 1,019 officers and men. Evan-Thomas' squadron finally closed the gap to the fighting ships sufficiently to open fire at 4.08 pm at extreme range. The exchange continued, with the British ships now chasing Hipper's squadron which was running to the south, towards the assistance of the High Seas Fleet (HSF) which was heading north to meet it. During this chase, at approximately 4.26 pm another of Beatty's battlecruisers, the Queen Mary, suffered the same fate as the Indefatigable, exploding and sinking with the loss of all but nine of her crew of 1,275 men.

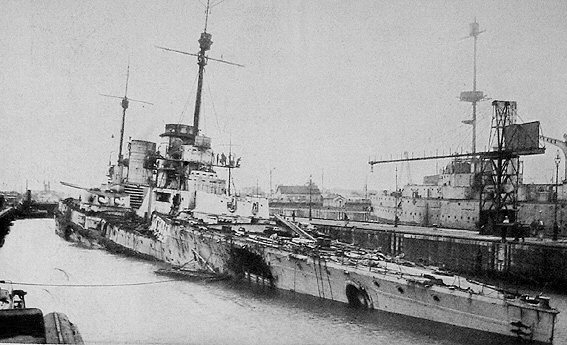
SMS Seydlitz damaged at Jutland

The four remaining British battlecruisers were still ahead of Evan-Thomas' 5th BS when first contact was made with the HSF. Beatty ordered a reversal of course, now attempting to lead the German fleet northwards towards the British Grand Fleet. At this point a second signalling error occurred with flag signals sent to the 5th BS ordering it also to turn about. A signal was raised by Lion and seen by Barham as it steamed past the now retreating Lion in the opposite direction. However, the signal was not lowered (which was the point at which it was supposed to be carried out) until the battleships were dangerously close to the German fleet and under heavy fire, and then the order was to 'turn in succession'. This means each ship turns as it reaches exactly the same spot in the ocean, and in this situation marked out a perfect target area upon which the German fleet could aim as each British ship passed through it in turn. The last ship, Malaya, seeing the firefight ahead turned early.

The next phase of the battle ('the run to the north') saw Beatty running ahead in his faster battlecruisers, with the better armoured 5th BS two miles behind. During this period Beatty lost touch with the enemy, but Evan-Thomas' ships continued to exchange fire. The battle continued until the northwards run reached the Grand Fleet, still heading south. Jellicoe had considerable difficulty deploying his fleet to best meet the oncoming German ships, because he had inadequate information as to their position, but succeeded in forming a battle line across their path. The 5th Battle Squadron acquitted itself well during the run, but some ships suffered considerable damage. In particular Warspite suffered damage to her steering gear, which resulted in the helm jamming as the ships turned to take up station at the rear of the British battle line. This resulted in her steaming in circles in the 'killing zone' between the two fleets before steering could be restored. This proved fortuitous for the cruiser Warrior which had been severely damaged at this same spot by German fire, but managed to limp away covered by the circling Warspite. Warspite eventually limped back to port, though Warrior had to be abandoned. The German fleet turned away once it realised the presence of the Grand Fleet, and although exchanges continued sporadically, continued to avoid contact with the British until it could make good its withdrawal to Horn's Reef and then to Germany.

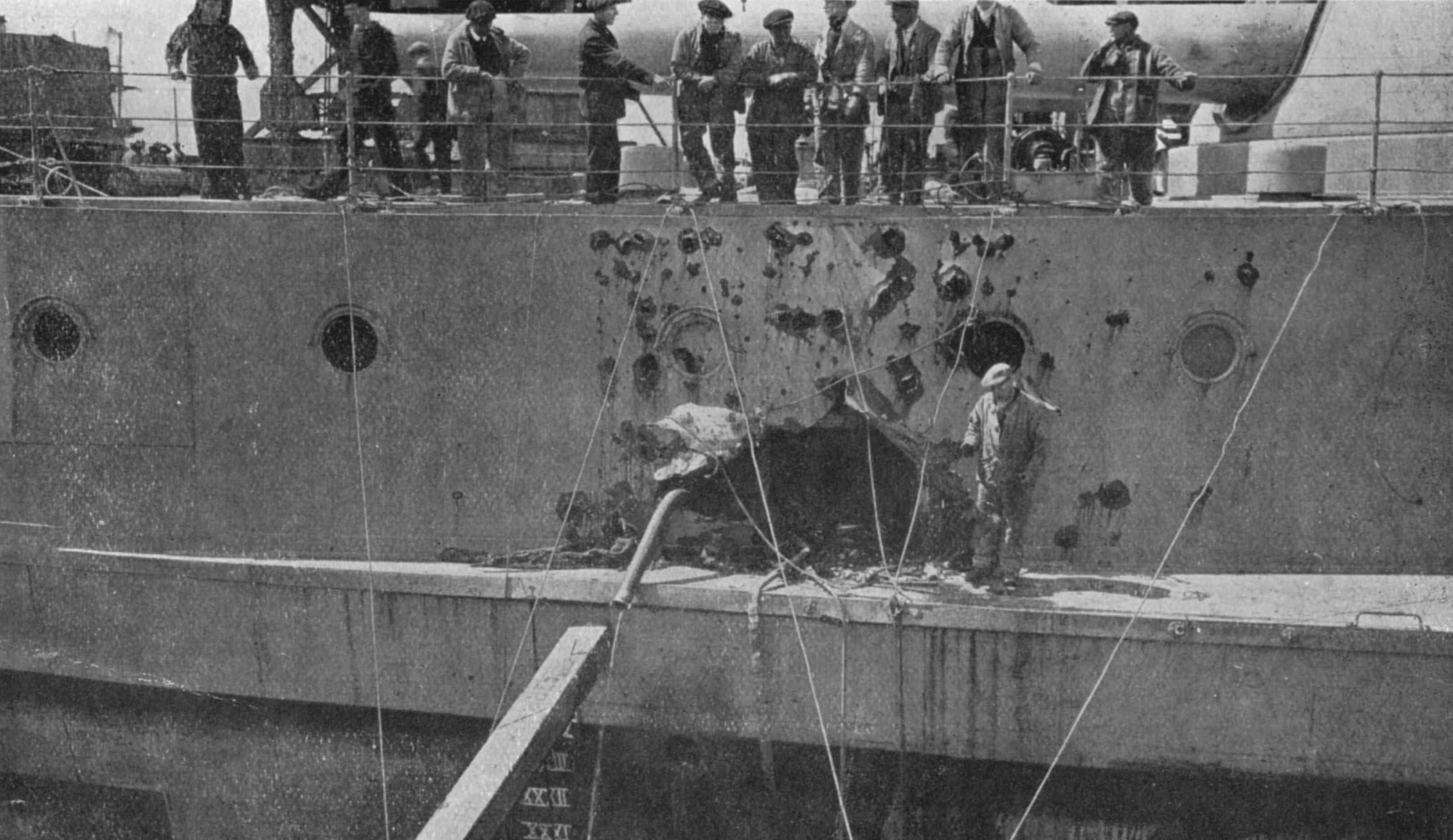
A shell strike on HMS Warspite

John Jellicoe was replaced as commander of the Grand Fleet by Beatty in November 1916, largely as a result of public perceptions that the British had not performed well at Jutland. The change came in the form of promotion, with Jellicoe becoming First Sea Lord. Evan-Thomas commented 'our chief is of course a great loss...Our new chief will be first rate'. One consequence of the change was that Beatty chose to transfer the role of fleet flagship from HMS Iron Duke to Queen Elizabeth, which had been Evan-Thomas' flagship as part of the squadron of the five fastest fleet battleships. The choice was an odd one, because it effectively meant one of the fastest and most powerful ships was no longer available for detached duties with the battlecruisers.

In June 1917, George V visited the fleet and an investiture ceremony was held onboard Queen Elizabeth for sailors who had won awards at Jutland. Beatty interrupted the ceremony just as Evan-Thomas was to receive his knighthood from the King, offering his own sword to be used in the ceremony.

On 1 October 1918, Evan-Thomas was replaced as commander of the 5th Battle Squadron by Rear-Admiral Arthur Leveson. In March 1921 he became Commander-in-Chief, The Nore (a home port command based at Chatham). He received a number of decorations from five countries including the Croix de Guerre with palms, and an honorary doctorate from Prifysgol Cymru at Bangor in 1920. In 1922 he became High Sheriff of Glamorgan.

== Post-war controversy ==
After the battle and still by the end of the war, considerable controversy abounded over exactly what had happened at Jutland and who, if anyone, was to blame for perceived failings. With the war over, it was decided to publish an official history of the battle. Captain John Harper was appointed by the then First Sea Lord, Sir Rosslyn Wemyss, to review all the available documentation and write the report. At the moment Wemyss retired and was replaced as First Sea Lord by Beatty, the finished book had already reached the stage of proof copies awaiting approval on his desk. Beatty objected to the account, requesting Harper make alterations which Harper refused to do unless Beatty would give him written orders to that effect. It had already become known to the public that Harper was writing the account (questions had been asked about it in Parliament) and he refused to put his name to an account he could not agree with. Instead, Beatty appointed two brothers, Captains Alfred Dewar and Kenneth Dewar to write a 'staff appreciation' of the battle, which would be circulated to navy officers only. The Harper report was passed to Sir Julian Corbett, who was writing an official history of the whole naval war on behalf of the Committee of Imperial Defence. Corbett was shown the staff appreciation, and said I 'read it with increasing wonder till at last I felt it my duty to convey to the Admiralty that such a grotesque account of the battle certainly ought not to go out as their considered verdict'. The account was classified as 'secret' and yet another version was commissioned, the 'Admiralty Narrative'. This was shown to Jellicoe, and a long correspondence ensued where he objected to many parts of the narrative. With particular reference to Evan-Thomas, Jellicoe objected to the claim that Evan-Thomas had been responsible for the distance between his ships and Beatty's, which had resulted in Beatty going into battle without the support of the four most powerful ships in his command.

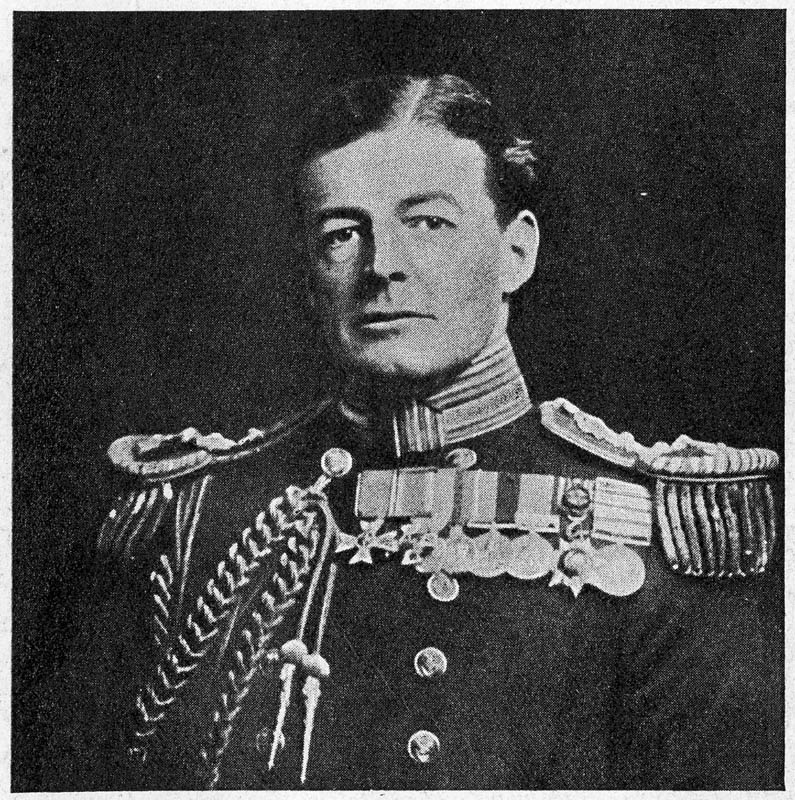
David Beatty, who disagreed over events at the Battle of Jutland

Evan-Thomas was never consulted over the account, but had obtained a copy. He arranged to speak to First Lord of the Admiralty Leo Amery in July 1923, but the meeting and ensuing correspondence with the Admiralty failed to reach a satisfactory conclusion. The issue now also included when a flag signal from Lion had been hoisted and then lowered (which was the point at which the ship receiving the order was supposed to act upon it), the failure of which signal caused Evan-Thomas to continue steaming towards the enemy when he should have turned away with Beatty's other ships. Evan-Thomas arranged another interview in December 1923, but on this occasion Beatty interrupted the meeting before Evan-Thomas could explain his business, and 'pushed' him out of the room. Evan-Thomas returned to Chatham, but by 2.30 pm that day he was taken ill and was diagnosed to have suffered a stroke. In March 1924, he was obliged to retire, and was not sufficiently well to attend a formal interview with the King, as would be expected for a retiring admiral. He was promoted to Knight Grand Cross of the Order of the Bath (GCB) in the 1924 Birthday Honours for his services to the Royal Navy.

In June 1924, the Admiralty Narrative was published, still without the corrections demanded by Jellicoe. Instead, a list of Jellicoe's objections was included as an appendix, together with refutations by the Admiralty which Jellicoe had not been permitted to see. In May 1925, Evan-Thomas was finally able to see the King and discuss the matter. King George was now in the position of formally having to support the Admiralty: He recognised Evan-Thomas' legitimate grievances, but felt Beatty was an effective First Sea Lord at a time when the Navy was under considerable threat from spending cuts and changes in public opinion, he felt it 'better for the nation that there should be no more controversy'.

Matters continued to simmer. German accounts of the battle were published, which went some way to credit Evan-Thomas' ships with most of the success against Hipper during the battle cruiser action. Then in 1927, Winston Churchill published his own account of the war, coming down heavily on Beatty's side in the argument. This prompted Evan-Thomas, now somewhat recovered from his illness, to write to The Times, publicly stating his case. A number of newspapers carried articles criticising Beatty's connection with the official report, and its contents. In March, a staged question about Evan-Thomas' failure to close up his ships with Beatty's was asked in the House of Commons, and answered with a statement that signal logs from Barham indicated signals to change course had indeed been received, at least as far as her accompanying destroyers were concerned. Harper had now retired from the navy, and published a new version of his account (The Truth about Jutland). Beatty was coming to the end of his appointment as First Sea Lord and was due to be replaced by Jellicoe's brother-in-law, Sir Charles Madden, and found his last few months a time of considerable criticism. The original Harper Record was now also published.

Evan-Thomas became Commander-in-Chief, The Nore, in 1921 and retired in 1924.

== Legacy ==
Mount Evan-Thomas, the highest summit in the Opal Range in Alberta, Canada, is named in his honor.

== Bibliography ==
- Andrew Gordon (1996). The Rules of the Game: Jutland and British Naval Command. London: John Murray. ISBN 0-7195-5076-9.

Military offices
| Preceded by Hugh Tyrwhitt | Private Secretary to the First Lord of the Admiralty; 1905–1908 | Succeeded by Charles Madden |
| Preceded by Sir Doveton Sturdee | Commander-in-Chief, The Nore; 1921–1924 | Succeeded by Sir William Goodenough |
