= John de Robeck =

Royal Navy Admiral (1862–1928)

Admiral of the Fleet Sir John de Robeck Bt GCB GCMG GCVO
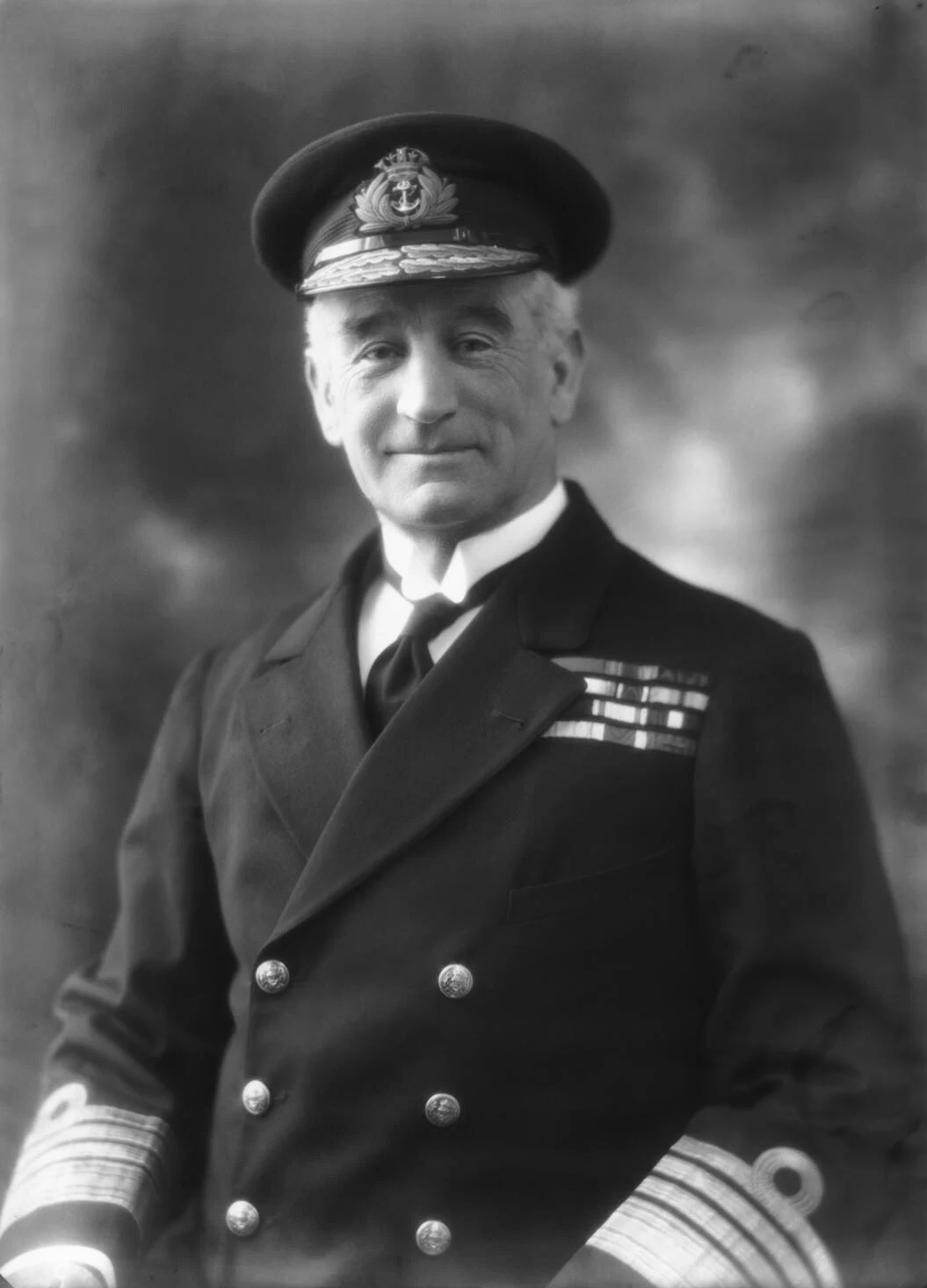
- Sir John Michael de Robeck
- Born: 10 June 1862; Naas, County Kildare, Ireland
- Died: 20 January 1928 (aged 65); London, England
- Spouse: Hilda Maud (Lady de Robeck)
- Military career
- Allegiance: United Kingdom
- Branch: Royal Navy
- Service years: 1875–1924
- Rank: Admiral of the Fleet
- Commands: Atlantic Fleet; Commander-in-Chief, Mediterranean Fleet; 2nd Battle Squadron; 3rd Battle Squadron; Eastern Mediterranean Squadron; 9th Cruiser Squadron; HMS Dominion; HMS Carnarvon; HMS Mermaid; HMS Angler; HMS Desperate
- Conflicts: First World War
- Awards: Knight Grand Cross of the Order of the Bath; Knight Grand Cross of the Order of St Michael and St George; Knight Grand Cross of the Royal Victorian Order

Admiral of the Fleet Sir John Michael de Robeck, 1st Baronet, GCB, GCMG, GCVO (10 June 1862 – 20 January 1928) was an officer in the Royal Navy. In the early years of the 20th century he served as Admiral of Patrols, commanding four flotillas of destroyers.

De Robeck commanded the allied naval force in the Dardanelles during the First World War. His campaign to force the straits, launched on 18 March 1915, was nearly successful, as the Turkish land-based artillery almost ran out of ammunition. However, mines laid in the straits led to the loss of three allied battleships. The subsequent ground campaign, like the naval campaign, was ultimately a failure and the ground troops had to be taken off the Gallipoli peninsula by de Robeck on the night of 8 January 1916. He went on to become Commander of the 3rd Battle Squadron of the Grand Fleet and then Commander of the 2nd Battle Squadron of the Grand Fleet.

After the war de Robeck became Commander-in-Chief of the Mediterranean Fleet and British High Commissioner to Turkey, and then Commander-in-Chief of the Atlantic Fleet.

== Naval career ==
=== Early career ===
Born the son of John Henry Edward Fock, 4th Baron de Robeck (a member of the Swedish nobility) and Zoë Sophia Charlotte Fock (née Burton), de Robeck joined the Royal Navy as a cadet in the training ship HMS Britannia on 15 July 1875. Promoted to midshipman on 27 July 1878, he joined the frigate HMS Shannon in the Channel Squadron in July 1878 and then transferred to the training ship HMS St Vincent at Portsmouth in April 1882. Promoted to sub-lieutenant on 27 July 1882, he joined the gunnery school HMS Excellent in August 1882 before transferring to the gunboat HMS Espoir on the China Station in August 1883. Promoted to lieutenant on 30 September 1885, he transferred to the battleship HMS Audacious, flagship of the Commander-in-Chief, China in early 1886, to the brig HMS Seaflower in March 1887 and to the battleship HMS Agincourt, flagship of the Channel Squadron, in November 1887. He joined the staff of the training ship HMS Britannia in September 1888 and then transferred to the armoured cruiser HMS Imperieuse, flagship of the China Station, in January 1891 before returning to the staff of the training ship HMS Britannia in August 1893.

De Robeck became gunnery officer in the corvette HMS Cordelia on the North America and West Indies Station in November 1895 and, following promotion to commander on 22 June 1897, became commanding officer of the destroyer HMS Desperate at Chatham in July 1897, next the destroyer HMS Angler at Chatham in July 1898 and then the destroyer HMS Mermaid at Chatham in June 1899. After that he became executive officer in the cruiser HMS Pyramus in the Mediterranean Fleet in June 1900.

Promoted to captain on 1 January 1902, de Robeck was in July 1902 appointed in command of HMS Warrior, depot ship at Portsmouth. He temporarily commissioned HMS Hercules for short while during summer 1902, waiting for Warrior to be ready from an extensive refit. He became commanding officer of the armoured cruiser HMS Carnarvon in the Mediterranean Fleet in August 1906, commanding officer of the battleship HMS Dominion in the Channel Fleet in January 1908 and then inspecting officer of boys' training establishments in January 1910. Promoted to rear admiral on 1 December 1911, he became Admiral of Patrols, commanding four flotillas of destroyers, in April 1912.

=== First World War ===
De Robeck received command of the 9th Cruiser Squadron, with his flag in the protected cruiser HMS Amphitrite, in August 1914, just after the start of the First World War. In this position, he captured the German liners SS Schlesien and SS Graecia.

De Robeck became second-in-command, under Admiral Sackville Carden, of the Eastern Mediterranean Squadron (the Allied naval forces in the Dardanelles), with his flag in the battleship HMS Vengeance, in February 1915. Carden received instructions to force the straits and then push on to Constantinople: he made an unsuccessful attempt to do this on 19 February 1915, but then fell seriously ill, leaving de Robeck to take command, with his flag in the battleship HMS Queen Elizabeth, in March 1915. De Robeck's campaign to force the straits, launched on 18 March 1915, nearly succeeded, as the Turkish land-based artillery almost ran out of ammunition: however, mines laid in the straits led to the loss of three Allied battleships. De Robeck, seeing no sense in losing more ships, then abandoned the whole naval operation. On 25 April 1915 the Royal Navy landed General Ian Hamilton's troops at the tip of the Gallipoli peninsula (Cape Helles) and at Anzac Cove, on the peninsula's western coast. The Ottoman forces and their German advisors had had two months warning from the first serious navy attack to prepare ground defences before the follow-up ground landing could be mounted, and they used the time effectively. The initial landings failed to achieve their objectives, and the Allies made a further unsuccessful attempt, in August 1915, at Suvla Bay. In the wake of this setback, Commodore Roger Keyes, de Robeck's Chief of Staff, argued for a third attempt to force the straits, but de Robeck recommended against it and the Admiralty accepted de Robeck's advice. The ground campaign, like the naval campaign, ultimately proved a failure, and although de Robeck was appointed a Knight Commander of the Order of the Bath for his service in the Gallipoli Campaign on 1 January 1916, he had to organize the evacuation of Hamilton's troops off the Gallipoli peninsula on the night of 8 January 1916.

De Robeck went on to become Commander of the 3rd Battle Squadron of the Grand Fleet, with his flag in the battleship HMS Britannia, in May 1916; and Commander of the 2nd Battle Squadron of the Grand Fleet, with his flag in the battleship HMS King George V, in November 1916. He was promoted to vice admiral on 17 May 1917.

=== After the war ===
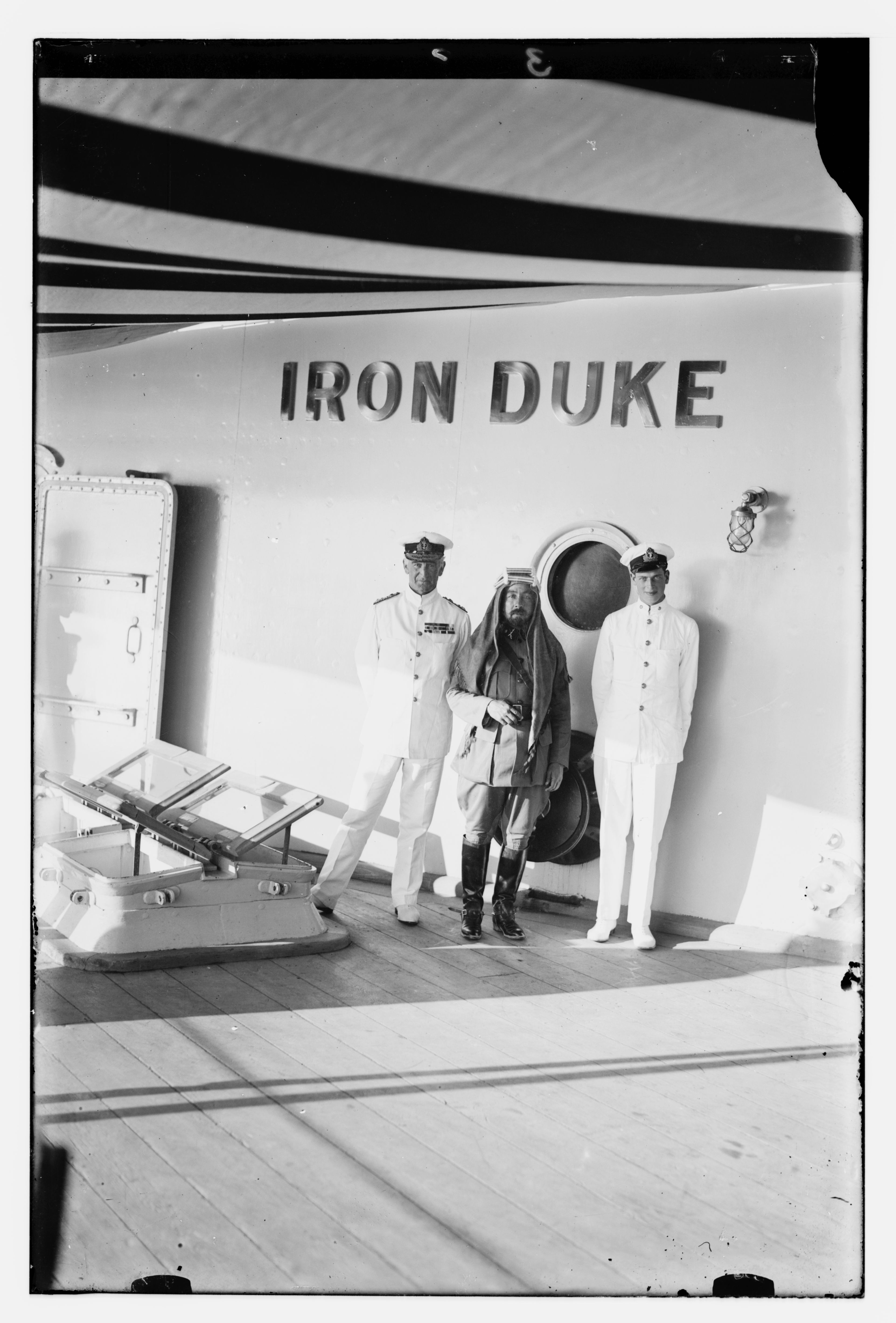
De Robeck (left) with Emir Abdullah of Jordan (centre) in HMS Iron Duke, flagship of the Mediterranean Fleet, in 1921

Appointed a Knight Grand Cross of the Order of St Michael and St George on 1 January 1919, de Robeck became Commander-in-Chief, Mediterranean Fleet and British High Commissioner to Turkey, with his flag in the battleship HMS Iron Duke, in July 1919. He was created a baronet on 29 December 1919 and promoted to full admiral on 24 March 1920. Advanced to Knight Grand Cross of the Order of the Bath on 1 January 1921, he went on to be Commander-in-Chief, Atlantic Fleet in August 1922 before retiring in August 1924.

In retirement de Robeck became President of the Marylebone Cricket Club. Appointed a Knight Grand Cross of the Royal Victorian Order in November 1925, he was promoted to Admiral of the Fleet on 24 November 1925 and died at his home in London on 20 January 1928.

== Family ==
In 1922 he married Hilda, Lady Lockhart, widow of Sir Simon Macdonald Lockhart, 5th Baronet; they had no children.

== Honours and awards ==
- Knight Grand Cross of the Order of the Bath – 1 January 1921 (KCB – 1 January 1916)
- Knight Grand Cross of the Order of St Michael and St George – 1 January 1919
- Knight Grand Cross of the Royal Victorian Order – November 1925
- Knight of Grace of the Venerable Order of Saint John – 29 November 1920
- Grand Officer of the French Legion of Honour – 9 August 1916
- Grand Cross of the Order of the Crown of Italy – 11 August 1917
- Japanese Order of the Sacred Treasure, 1st class – 29 August 1917
- Grand Officer of the Order of the Crown of Romania – 17 March 1919

== Sources ==
- Carlyon, Les A. (2002). Gallipoli. New York: Pan Macmillan. ISBN 978-0-7329-1128-7.
- Heathcote, Tony (2002). The British Admirals of the Fleet 1734 – 1995. Pen & Sword Ltd. ISBN 0-85052-835-6.

Military offices
Preceded by Sir Somerset Gough-Calthorpe	Commander-in-Chief, Mediterranean Fleet; 1919–1922	Succeeded by Sir Osmond Brock
Preceded by Sir Charles Madden	Commander-in-Chief, Atlantic Fleet; 1922–1924	Succeeded by Sir Henry Oliver
