= Mount Packenham =

Mountain in the Canadian Rockies

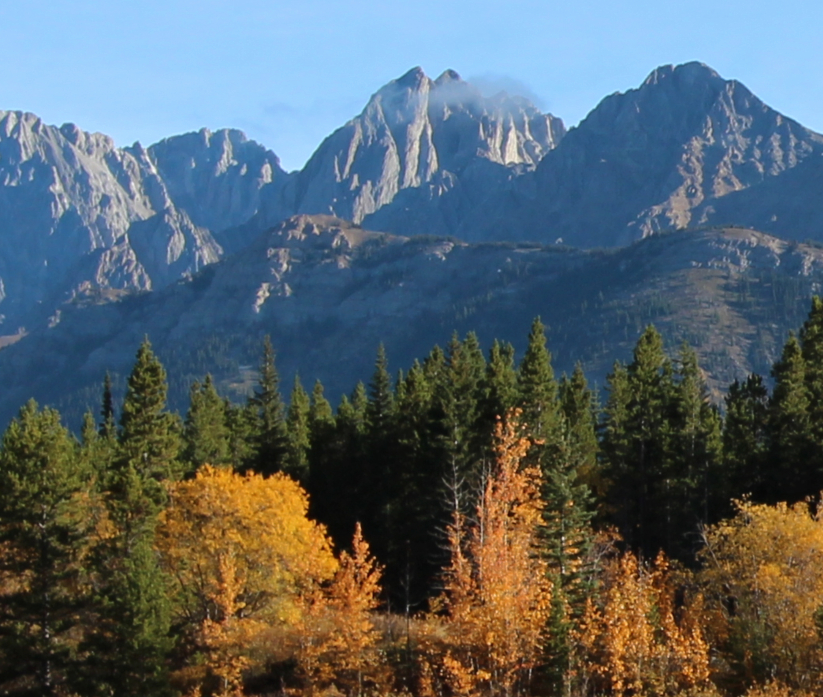
- Mount Packenham (centered), west face showing

Highest point
- Elevation: 3,000 m (9,800 ft)
- Prominence: 242 m (794 ft)
- Parent peak: Mount Evan-Thomas (3097 m)
- Listing: Mountains of Alberta
- Coordinates: 50°45′14″N 115°05′27″W

Geography
- Location within Alberta Location within Canada
- Country: Canada
- Province: Alberta
- Parent range: Opal Range; Canadian Rockies
- Topo map: NTS 82J14 Spray Lakes Reservoir

Geology
- Rock age: Cambrian
- Rock type: Limestone

Climbing
- First ascent: 1954 by N. Gish, M. Dickson, P. Rainier, S.G. Pearson
- Easiest route: Mountaineering YDS 5.6

Mount Packenham is a 3,000-metre (9,800-foot) mountain summit located in the Opal Range of the Canadian Rockies of Alberta, Canada. Its nearest higher peak is Mount Evan-Thomas, 1.0 km (0.62 mi) to the north. Situated on the eastern boundary of Peter Lougheed Provincial Park, the peak is visible from Highway 40 and the Kananaskis Lakes area.

Like so many of the mountains in Kananaskis Country, Mount Packenham received its name from the persons and ships involved in the 1916 Battle of Jutland, the only major sea battle of the First World War.

== History ==
The mountain was named in honor of Rear Admiral Sir William C. Pakenham (1861-1933), commander of the 2nd Battlecruiser Squadron during the Battle of Jutland in World War I.

The mountain's name was made official in 1922 by the Geographical Names Board of Canada based on a misspelling of Pakenham's name made by the Interprovincial Boundary Commission.

The first ascent of the peak was made in 1954 by N. Gish, Malcolm Dickson, P. Rainier, and S.G. Pearson. It has been suggested that this group was actually on Mount Evan-Thomas, which may make the first ascent be in 1972 by J. Pomeroy, M. Simpson and D. Forrest and G. Boles.

== Geology ==
Mount Packenham is composed of sedimentary rock laid down during the Precambrian to Jurassic periods. Formed in shallow seas, this sedimentary rock was pushed east and over the top of younger rock during the Laramide orogeny. Mount Packenham was created during the Lewis Overthrust. The steeply tilted strata are virtually the same in each peak of the Opal Range, with softer layers sandwiched between harder layers.

== Climate ==
Based on the Köppen climate classification, Mount Packenham is located in a subarctic climate zone with cold, snowy winters, and mild summers. Temperatures can drop below −20 °C with wind chill factors below −30 °C.

In terms of favorable weather, June through September are the best months to climb Mount Packenham.

Precipitation runoff from the west side of the mountain drains into the Kananaskis River, the east side drains into tributaries of the Elbow River, and then both of these merge into the Bow River, and finally into the Saskatchewan River.

== Gallery ==
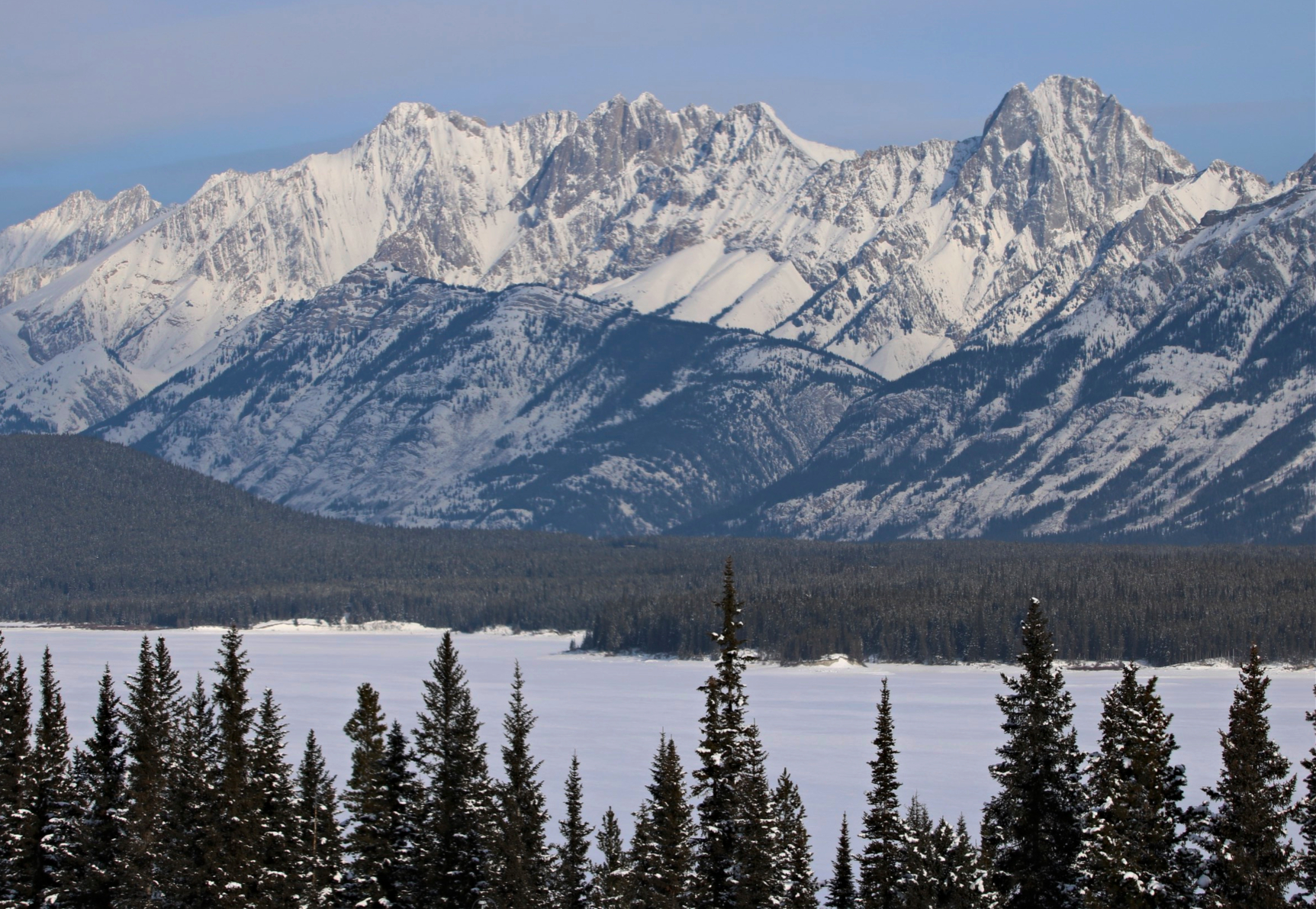
Winter scene of Mount Packenham centered between Evan-Thomas and Brock

== See also ==
- List of mountains of Canada
- Geography of Alberta
