= Osmond Brock =

Royal Navy Admiral of the Fleet (1869–1947)

Admiral of the Fleet Sir Osmond Brock GCB KCMG KCVO
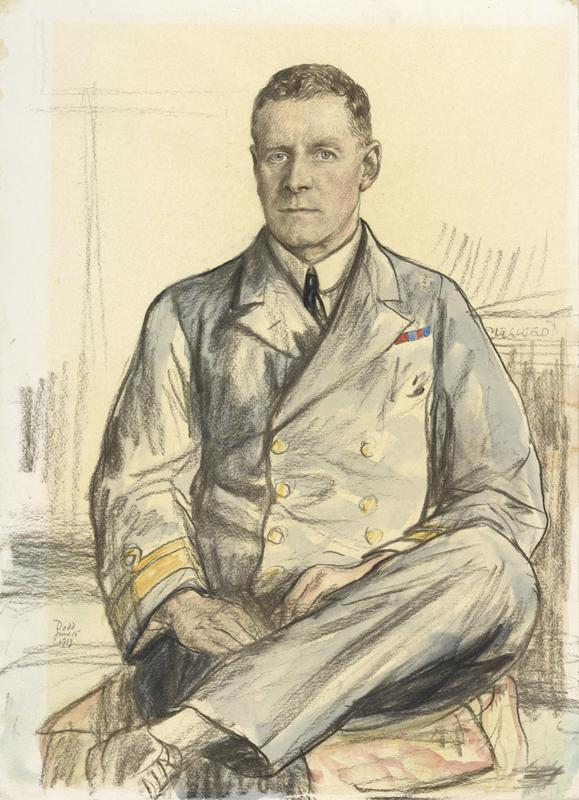
- 1917 portrait by Francis Dodd
- Born: 5 January 1869; Plymouth, Devon
- Died: 15 October 1947 (aged 78); Winchester, Hampshire
- Military career
- Allegiance: United Kingdom
- Branch: Royal Navy
- Service years: 1882–1933
- Rank: Admiral of the Fleet
- Commands: Portsmouth Command (1926–29); Mediterranean Fleet (1922–25); 1st Battlecruiser Squadron (1915–16); HMS Princess Royal (1912–15); HMS King Edward VII (1909–10); HMS Bulwark (1905–07); HMS Enchantress (1904–05); HMS Alacrity (1903–04)
- Conflicts: First World War: Battle of Heligoland Bight; Battle of Dogger Bank; Battle of Jutland; Chanak Crisis
- Awards: Knight Grand Cross of the Order of the Bath; Knight Commander of the Order of St Michael and St George; Knight Commander of the Royal Victorian Order; Order of the Rising Sun, 2nd Class (Japan); Order of Saint Stanislaus, 1st Class with Swords (Russia); Commander of the Legion of Honour (France); Order of the Striped Tiger, 2nd Class (China)

Admiral of the Fleet Sir Osmond de Beauvoir Brock, GCB, KCMG, KCVO (5 January 1869 – 15 October 1947) was a Royal Navy officer. Brock served as assistant director of naval intelligence and then as assistant director of naval mobilisation at the Admiralty in the early years of the 20th century. During the First World War Brock commanded the battlecruiser HMS Princess Royal at the Battle of Heligoland Bight and at the Battle of Dogger Bank. He then commanded the 1st Battlecruiser Squadron with his flag in HMS Princess Royal at the Battle of Jutland.

After the war Brock became Deputy Chief of the Naval Staff and then went on to be Commander-in-Chief of the Mediterranean Fleet. Following the Turkish victory in Anatolia at the end of the Greco-Turkish War, Brock organised the rescue of fleeing Greek civilians and, by skillful deployment of his ships, he dissuaded the advancing Turks, led by Mustafa Kemal Atatürk, from attacking the British garrison at Chanak in the Dardanelles neutral zone. For his diplomatic handling of the Chanak Crisis, Brock was commended by Leo Amery, the First Lord of the Admiralty, in the House of Commons in 1923.

== Naval career ==
=== Early career ===
Born the eldest son of Commander Osmond de Beauvoir Brock and Lucretia Jenkins (née Clark), Brock was educated at Windlesham House School, Brighton from 1878 to 1881, from where he passed second out of 100 competitors for Royal Naval cadetships. On 1 January 1882 he joined the Royal Navy as a cadet in the training ship HMS Britannia. Promoted to midshipman on 18 August 1884, he was posted to the corvette HMS Carysfort in the Mediterranean Fleet, to the barbette battleship HMS Temeraire also in the Mediterranean Fleet and then to the frigate HMS Raleigh on the Cape of Good Hope and West Coast of Africa Station. While on that station he was awarded a certificate from the Royal Humane Society for saving a man from drowning. He joined the corvette HMS Active in the Training Squadron in November 1887 before being promoted to sub-lieutenant on 14 August 1888.

Promoted to lieutenant, after first classes in every subject and maximum seniority, on 14 February 1889, Brock joined the battleship HMS Trafalgar, flagship of the Second-in-Command of the Mediterranean Fleet, in April 1890. After attending the gunnery school HMS Excellent, he became gunnery officer in the turret ship HMS Devastation at Devonport in August 1894. He went on to be gunnery officer in the cruiser HMS Cambrian in the Mediterranean Fleet in October 1894 and gunnery officer in the battleship HMS Ramillies, flagship of the Commander-in-Chief of the Mediterranean Fleet, in November 1895. Promoted to commander on 1 January 1900, he became executive officer in the battleship HMS Repulse in the Channel Squadron in January 1901 and executive officer in the battleship HMS Renown, flagship of the Commander-in-Chief of the Mediterranean Fleet, in August 1901. In July 1902 it was announced that he was appointed to HMS Albion, second flagship of the China Station, but the appointment was cancelled the following week. He was briefly posted to HMS Empress of India, serving in the Home Fleet, in early November 1902, but in January 1903 he became commanding officer of the despatch vessel HMS Alacrity, serving on the China station.

Promoted to captain on 1 January 1904, Brock left the Alacrity after a year in January 1904, and became commanding officer of the newly commissioned Admiralty yacht HMS Enchantress in May 1904. He subsequently became Flag Captain to the Commander-in-Chief of the Mediterranean Fleet in the battleship HMS Bulwark in May 1905. He went on to be assistant director of Naval Intelligence at the Admiralty in 1906 and then became Flag Captain to the Vice-Admiral commanding the Second Division of the Home Fleet in the battleship HMS King Edward VII in March 1909, before returning to the Admiralty as assistant director of Naval Mobilisation in August 1910. After that he became commanding officer of the battlecruiser HMS Princess Royal in August 1912. He was appointed an aide-de-camp to the King on 24 October 1913.

=== First World War ===
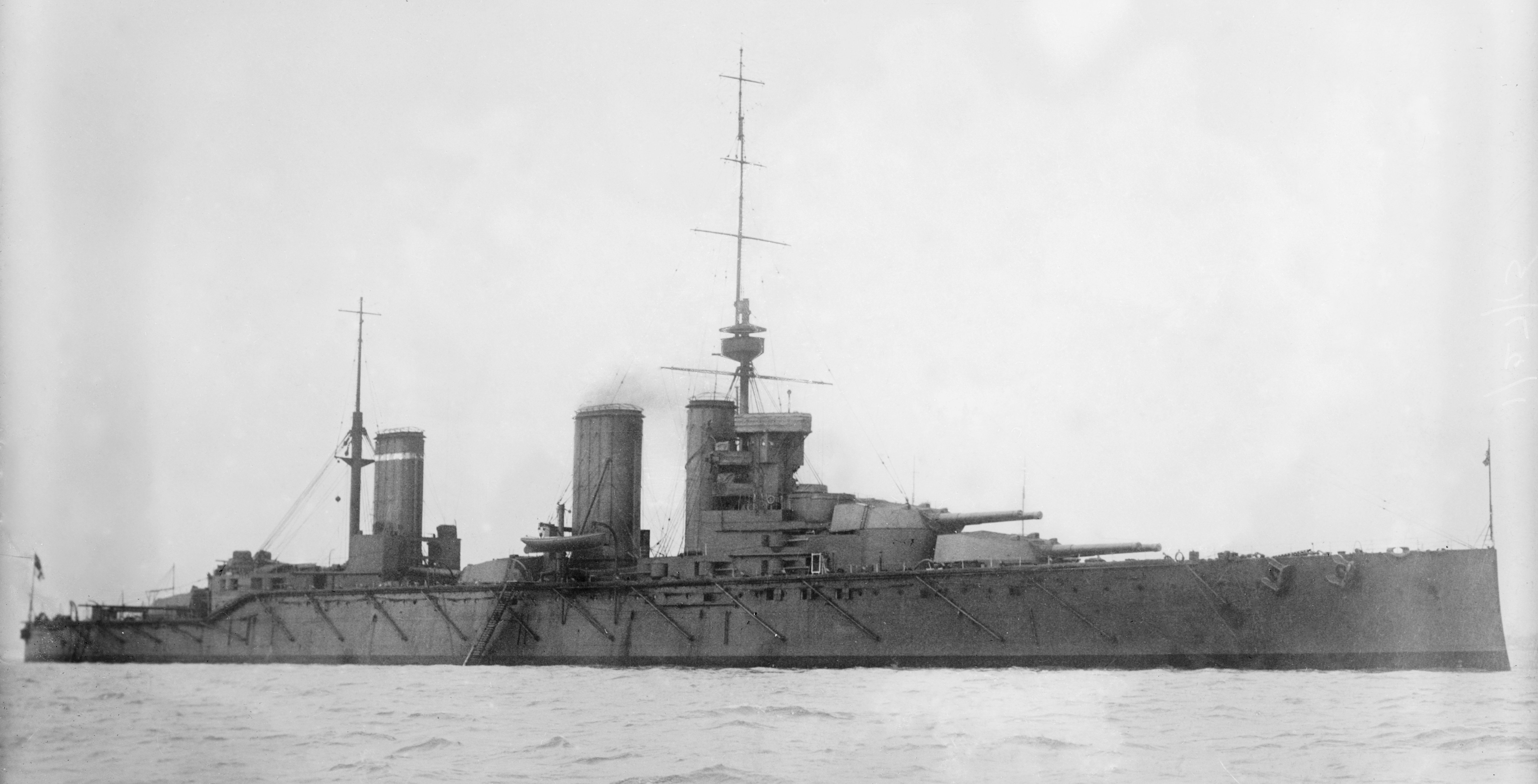
The battlecruiser, HMS Princess Royal, in which Brock saw action at the Battle of Heligoland Bight, Battle of Dogger Bank and Battle of Jutland

During the First World War, Brock commanded HMS Princess Royal at the Battle of Heligoland Bight in August 1914 and the Battle of Dogger Bank in January 1915. Appointed a Companion of the Order of the Bath on 3 March 1915 and promoted to rear admiral two days later, he became commander of the 1st Battlecruiser Squadron with his flag in HMS Princess Royal and saw action in that capacity at the Battle of Jutland in May 1916. At Jutland, Brock played an important role repeating messages from Vice Admiral Sir David Beatty, Commander of the Battlecruiser Fleet, whose radio was out of action. Brock was appointed a Companion of the Order of St Michael and St George on 31 May 1916. When Beatty was appointed Commander-in-Chief of the Grand Fleet in November 1916, he took Brock with him as his chief of staff.

Brock was appointed a Knight Commander of the Royal Victorian Order on 25 June 1917, advanced to Knight Commander of the Order of St Michael and St George on 1 January 1918, and to Knight Commander of the Order of the Bath on 5 April 1919.

=== After the war ===
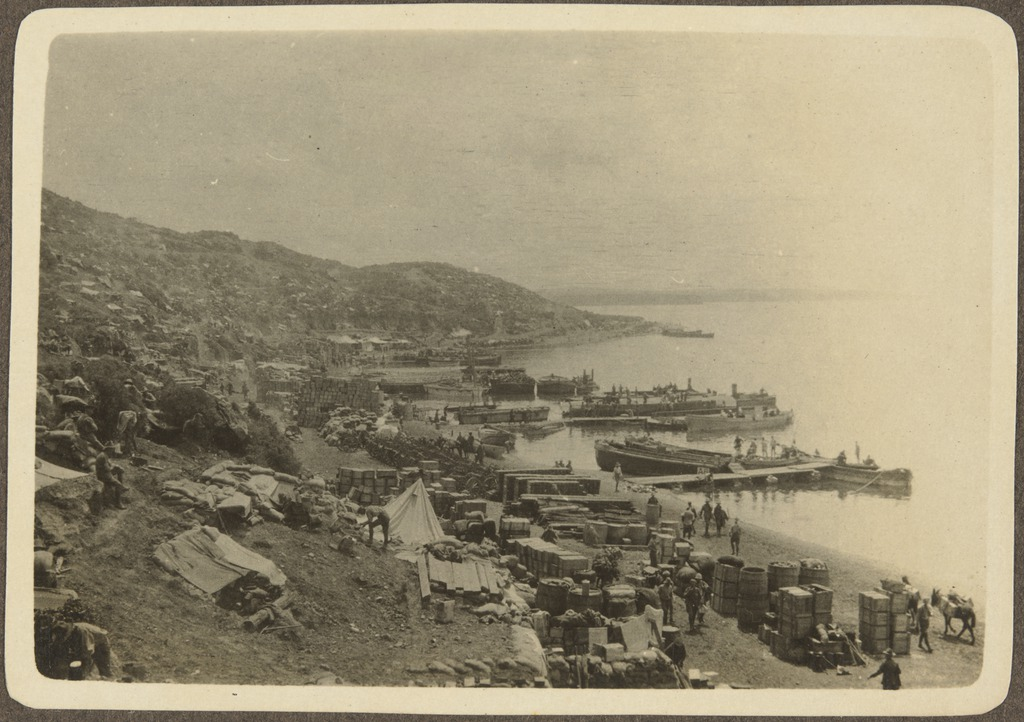
The beach at Chanak: Brock was praised for his handling of the Chanak Crisis

Brock became Deputy Chief of the Naval Staff and a Lord Commissioner of the Admiralty in July 1919 with promotion to vice admiral on 3 October. He went on to be Commander-in-Chief of the Mediterranean Fleet with his flag in the battleship HMS Iron Duke in April 1922. Following the Turkish victory in Anatolia at the end of the Greco-Turkish War in August 1922, Brock organised the rescue of the fleeing Greek army and, by skilful deployment of his ships, he dissuaded the advancing Turks, led by Mustafa Kemal Atatürk, from attacking the British garrison at Chanak in the Dardanelles neutral zone in September. By 12 September 1922, during the sack of Smyrna by the Turkish army, there were more than 150,000 refugees gathering on the quayside of Smyrna. While anchored in the Bay of Smyrna and appalled by the scenes of the refugees being attacked by Turkish soldiers, Brock ordered the ship's band to play music in order to drown out the sound of the screaming people. Later, Brock took dinner with his senior officers in the captain's quarters. For his diplomatic handling of the Chanak Crisis, Brock was commended by Leo Amery, the First Lord of the Admiralty, in the House of Commons in 1923. Promoted to full admiral on 31 July 1924, he moved his flag to the battleship HMS Queen Elizabeth later that year.

Brock became Commander-in-Chief, Portsmouth in July 1926 and, having been advanced to Knight Grand Cross of the Order of the Bath on 1 March 1929 and promoted to Admiral of the Fleet on 31 July 1929, he retired in July 1934. He attended the funeral of King George V in January 1936, and died at his home in Winchester on 14 October 1947.

== Family ==
In 1917 Brock married Irene Catherine Francklin (née Wake), daughter of Vice Admiral Sir Baldwin Wake Walker, 2nd Baronet; they had one daughter.

== Sources ==
- Heathcote, Tony (2002). The British Admirals of the Fleet 1734 – 1995. Pen & Sword Ltd. ISBN 0-85052-835-6.

Military offices
Preceded by Sir James Fergusson	Deputy Chief of the Naval Staff; 1919–1921	Succeeded by Sir Roger Keyes
Preceded by Sir John de Robeck	Commander-in-Chief, Mediterranean Fleet; 1922–1925	Succeeded by Sir Roger Keyes
Preceded by Sir Sydney Fremantle	Commander-in-Chief, Portsmouth; 1926–1929	Succeeded by Sir Roger Keyes
