= Mount Evan-Thomas =

Mountain in Alberta, Canada

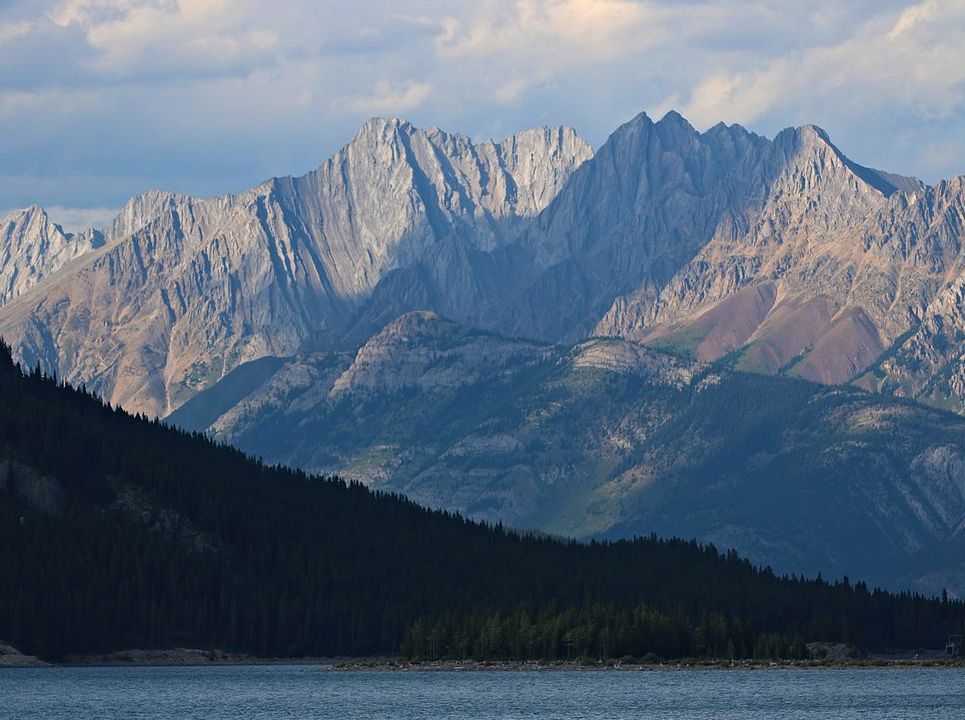
- Mount Evan-Thomas, centered in the sunlight. Mount Packenham shaded to the right.

Highest point
- Elevation: 3,097 m (10,161 ft)
- Prominence: 1,010 m (3,310 ft)
- Parent peak: Mount Rae (3225 m)
- Listing: Mountains of Alberta
- Coordinates: 50°45′57″N 115°05′45″W

Geography
- Location within Alberta Location within Canada
- Country: Canada
- Province: Alberta
- Parent range: Opal Range; Canadian Rockies
- Topo map: NTS 82J14 Spray Lakes Reservoir

Geology
- Rock type: sedimentary rock

Climbing
- First ascent: 1954 by M.S. Hicks, W. Lemmon, G. Ross, I. Spreat, J.F. Tarrant
- Easiest route: Scrambling YDS 4 with exposure

Mount Evan-Thomas is a 3,097-metre (10,161-foot) mountain summit located in the Opal Range of the Canadian Rockies of Alberta, Canada. Mount Evan-Thomas is the highest point in the Opal Range. It is situated in the Kananaskis River Valley northeast of Lower Kananaskis Lake and east of Highway 40 in Peter Lougheed Provincial Park. Its nearest higher peak is Mount Rae, 18.0 km (11.2 mi) to the south-southeast.

== History ==
The mountain was named in honor of Rear Admiral Sir Hugh Evan-Thomas (1862–1928), Royal Navy commander of the 5th Battle Squadron of the Grand Fleet during the Battle of Jutland in World War I. The name of the mountain was initially approved as Mount Evans-Thomas in 1922. The spelling error was corrected when the mountain's present name was made official in 1972 by the Geographical Names Board of Canada.

The first ascent of the peak was made in 1954 by M.S. Hicks, W. Lemmon, G. Ross, I. Spreat, and J.F. Tarrant.

== Geology ==
Mount Evan-Thomas is composed of sedimentary rock laid down during the Precambrian to Jurassic periods. Formed in shallow seas, this sedimentary rock was pushed east and over the top of younger rock during the Laramide orogeny. Mount Evan-Thomas was created during the Lewis Overthrust. The steeply tilted strata are virtually the same in each peak of the Opal Range, with softer layers sandwiched between harder layers.

== Climate ==
Based on the Köppen climate classification, Mount Evan-Thomas is located in a subarctic climate zone with cold, snowy winters, and mild summers. Temperatures can drop below −20 °C with wind chill factors below −30 °C.

In terms of favorable weather, June through September are the best months to climb Mount Evan-Thomas.

Precipitation runoff from the mountain drains into tributaries of the Kananaskis River.

== See also ==
- Alberta's Rockies
- Geology of the Rocky Mountains
