= HMS Enchantress (1903) =

Royal Navy yacht

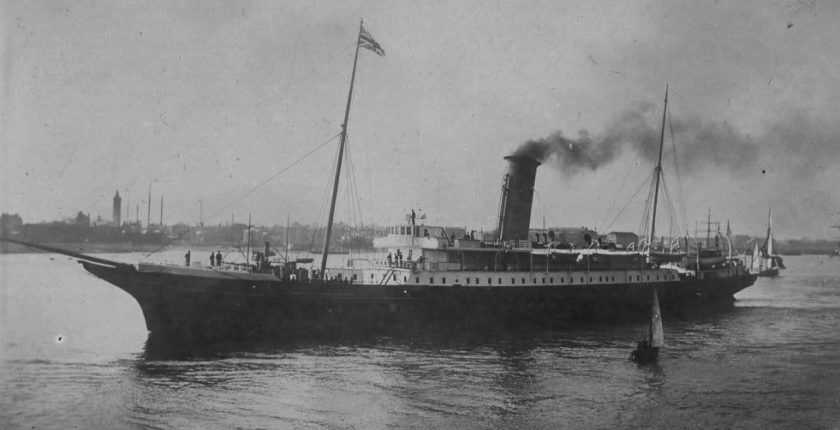
- HMS Enchantress in 1906

History

United Kingdom
- Name: Enchantress
- Builder: Harland & Wolff, Belfast
- Cost: £131,000
- Launched: 7 November 1903
- Fate: Sold for scrap in 1935

General characteristics
- Type: Yacht
- Displacement: 3,470 tonnes (3,420 long tons)
- Length: 320 ft (97.5 m)
- Beam: 40 ft (12.2 m)
- Installed power: 6,400 hp (4,800 kW)
- Propulsion: twin counter-rotating screws
- Armament: 3 × 3-pounder guns

HMS Enchantress was a yacht owned by the British Royal Navy, for use by members of the Admiralty Board, and was used by Winston Churchill to tour Royal Navy installations such as Gibraltar and Malta while he was First Lord of the Admiralty from 1911 to 1915.

Enchantress was built by Harland & Wolff of Belfast in the north of Ireland and launched in 1903 at a cost of £131,000. Her length was 320 feet (98 m) and had a beam 40 feet (12 m). The ship displacement of 3,470 tonnes (3,420 long tons) and was powered by a steam engine driving twin counter-rotating screws creating 6,400 horsepower (4,800 kW). The vessel's armament was three 3-pounder guns.

During World War I she was used as a hospital ship for officers. Enchantress was sold for scrap in 1935.
