= List of light cruisers of China =

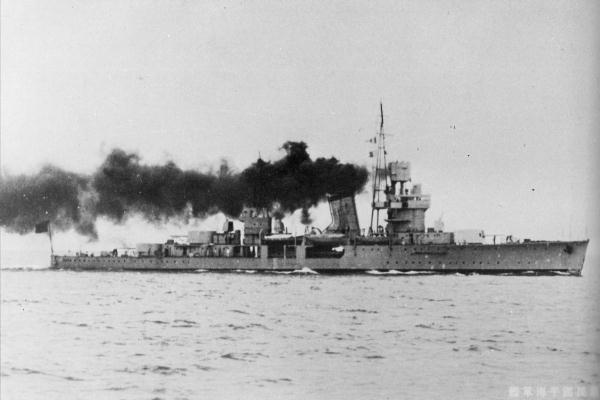
The light cruiser Ping Hai in 1936

The list of light cruisers of China includes all light cruisers built, modified, and commissioned by the Greater China regime after the Republic of China Navy began imitating light cruisers in the early 20th century. This includes ships from the Republic of China Navy led by the Nationalist government and the People's Liberation Army Navy (PLAN) led by the Chinese Communist Party, totaling six ships belonging to four different classes.

In the early 1930s the Nationalist government converted two torpedo gunboats, Jian'an and Jianwei, inherited from the Qing government. Then these two were reclassified as light cruisers and renamed as Ta Tong and Tze Chiang respectively. Simultaneously, the National Revolutionary Army ordered three cruisers with main guns' caliber of no more than 6 inches from domestic and international shipyards, which were named Yat Sen, Ning Hai, and Ping Hai. These light cruisers served as the mainstay of the Nationalist government's navy, participating in the War of Resistance Against Japan in 1937. But in the early stages of the war, all the light cruisers were either scuttled or sunk in battle for national defense. The three larger light cruisers sunk in battle were later captured and salvaged by the Japanese and reused. Of these three, two were sunk by Allied forces, and the third was recovered by the Nationalist government after the war.

After the end of World War II, HMS Aurora, an Arethusa-class cruiser, was transferred by the United Kingdom to the Nationalist Government of the time. Upon being taken over, this ship was renamed Chong Qing. In 1949, the ship mutinied and joined the People's Liberation Army Navy, becoming the only cruiser in the history of the PLAN. All surviving ships of this class were ultimately scrapped in the 1960s.

== History ==
As one of the most important warship types in the navies of various nations during the 19th century, cruisers evolved from the single-deck frigates of the Age of Sail. This ship type gradually took its definitive form in the mid-19th century, primarily tasked with fleet screening, reconnaissance, and patrolling the periphery, and occasionally engaging in commerce raiding. As a small, high-speed warship type during the steam-powered era, the Novik, a protected cruiser ordered by Russia in 1898 and built at the German shipyard Schichau-Werke, served as a typical scout vessel. Because her hull was larger than that of a destroyer and her speed exceeded that of small gunboats, the British Royal Navy classified her as a cruiser, specifically designating her as a "scout cruiser" (translated into Japanese as Tsūhōkan or Teisatsukan). Extending into the early 20th century, scout cruisers evolved into new classes of cruisers represented by the Weymouth class, Bristol class, Chatham class, Birmingham class, and Arethusa class. These vessels were uniformly classified by the British Royal Navy as "light cruisers".

On April 21, 1930, the United Kingdom, Japan, France, Italy, and the United States signed the first London Naval Treaty, classifying cruisers with main guns of less than 6 inches in caliber as light cruisers. In the early years of the Republic of China, due to budget constraints and other factors, the navy did not build any new cruisers for over a decade. Following the establishment of the Nationalist Government in Nanjing, the newly formed Ministry of the Navy built and refitted a total of five cruisers. Two of these were originally torpedo gunboats launched during the late Qing dynasty; after being taken over by the Republican government, they were used during the Northern Expedition. In the 1930s, these two vessels underwent refits and were subsequently reclassified as light cruisers. During the same period, the Republican government arranged for the Jiangnan Shipyard to construct the cruiser Yat Sen. Later, a light cruiser named Ning Hai was purchased from Japan, and a sister ship named Ping Hai was built as a copy. The Ping Hai was also the largest-tonnage cruiser built by the Jiangnan Shipyard during the Republican era.

These cruisers had a smaller displacement than those of other major maritime powers of the time, with some being comparable in size to large gunboats. Prior to the full-scale outbreak of the Second Sino-Japanese War, these light cruisers were the only capital ships in the fleet of the Republican government's navy. Following the full-scale outbreak of the war, all of these light cruisers were either scuttled or sunk in combat. After the war, the United Kingdom compensated the Nationalist Government of China with a light cruiser due to the sinking of several Republican customs patrol boats that had been requisitioned in Hong Kong during the war. This vessel was the Chong Qing.

Depending on different historical records and literature, the classification of the same vessel may vary; similarly, its designated role can change across different periods. For instance, the Ta tong-class was originally classified as torpedo gunboats when completed in the late Qing dynasty, but after being refitted during the Republican era, they were reclassified as light cruisers. After being captured by the Imperial Japanese Navy, Ning Hai and Ping Hai were renamed as Ioshima (五百島) and Yasoshima (八十島), respectively. They were initially designated as coastal defense ships (Kaibōkan), and later reclassified as second class cruiser (二等巡洋艦).

== Ta Tong class ==
Ta Tong (大同) and Tze Chiang (自強) were originally named as Chien An (建安) and Chien Wei (建威), which were two torpedo gunboats built for the Beiyang Fleet in the late Qing dynasty. These two vessels were designed by Doyere, a Frenchman hired by the Foochow Arsenal, with the hull steel and boilers imported from France. After the raw materials were procured from overseas, the construction was carried out entirely by the Foochow Arsenal's own shipyards. Initially designed and built to the specifications of destroyers, they were equipped with twin torpedo tubes. Upon completion, these two warships were not only China's earliest domestically built destroyers but also the best-performing vessels constructed by the Foochow Arsenal at the time.

Upon completion, the two vessels were assigned to the Yangtze Fleet. Following the outbreak of the Xinhai Revolution, they were incorporated into the Second Fleet of the Ministry of the Navy. During the Northern Expedition, these two cruisers responded to the uprising as National Revolutionary Army forces advanced on Shanghai, using their naval guns to bombard the Gaochangmiao Arsenal. By 1928, the two vessels had gradually been decommissioned and laid up.

In January 1930, the Ministry of the Navy of the Nationalist Government in Nanjing initiated a one-year project to convert the decommissioned Chien An and Chien Wei into light cruisers. The refit was carried out by the Jiangnan Shipyard at a cost of 467,200 silver rounds. During the conversion process, major modifications were made to their armament, boilers, hull, and decks. As a result of the refit, the overall displacement of the two vessels increased, while their top speed dropped significantly. They were equipped with larger-caliber guns, and their torpedo tubes were removed. Upon completion, the ships were renamed Ta Tong and Tze Chiang, respectively, and assigned to the First Fleet. In August 1937, the two vessels were scuttled at Jiangyin, along with more than 20 other military and civilian ships, to block the river channel and prevent Japanese forces from advancing upstream. Following the founding of the People's Republic of China, local authorities salvaged and dismantled the wrecks of both ships.

Ship	Builder	Armament	Armor	Displacement	Propulsion	Cost	Service			
Ship	Builder	Armament	Armor	Displacement	Propulsion	Cost	Laid down	Launched	Commissioned	Fate
Ta Tong (大同)	Qing dynasty Fujian Maritime Administration	2 × 120 mm (5 in)	—	1,050 t (1,033 long tons)	2 shafts, 4 coal-fired water-tube boilers quadruple-expansion reciprocating steam engine, 17 kn (31 km/h; 20 mph), 3,884 ihp (2,896 kW)	637,000 taels of silver	March 3, 1899 (Note: Other sources record the date as "February 11, 1899".)	March 3, 1900	December 1902 (Note: Other sources record the year as "1904".)	Scuttled near Luojia Bridge in Jingjiang on August 11, 1937
Tze Chiang (自強)	Qing dynasty Fujian Maritime Administration	2 × 120 mm (5 in)	—	1,050 t (1,033 long tons)	2 shafts, 4 coal-fired water-tube boilers quadruple-expansion reciprocating steam engine, 17 kn (31 km/h; 20 mph), 3,884 ihp (2,896 kW)	637,000 taels of silver	April 7, 1898	January 29, 1899	December 1902 (Note: Other sources record the year as "1904".)	Scuttled near the main channel of Jiangyin on August 11, 1937

== Yat Sen ==
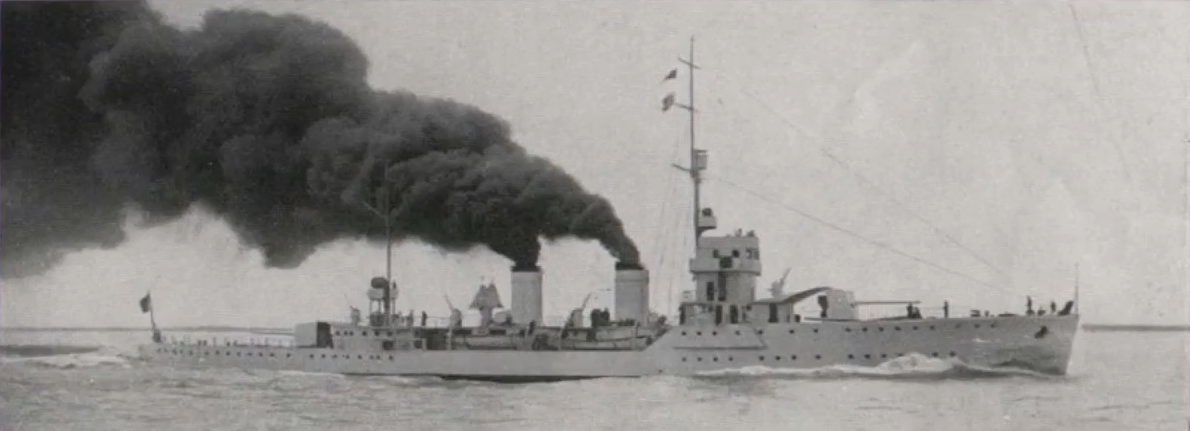
The Yat Sen in the early 1930s

Yat Sen (逸仙) was the fourth warship newly constructed by the Jiangnan Shipyard during the Nationalist Government era. The vessel was designed under the supervision of Ye Zaifu. Upon construction, with a displacement of nearly 1,550 tons, it was the largest ship in the Nationalist Navy. To highlight its special status, the navy named it after Sun Yat Sen, the founding father of the Republic of China. Externally, it featured a long forecastle hull form. While similar in appearance to the Hsien Ning (咸寧) and Ming Cheun (民權) previously ordered by the Nationalist Navy, Yat Sen was armed with a heavier weapons configuration. Its main armament consisted of a single 150 mm gun mounted at the bow, complemented by a 140 mm secondary gun at the stern.

This ship was laid down in April 1930. To commemorate the birth of Sun Yat-sen, she was launched in November 1930, under the presiding of Chen Shaokuan, then Acting Minister of the Navy, following six months of intensive construction. She commenced sea trials on May 15 of the following year, and after completing them in June, was commissioned into the First Fleet of the Navy at the end of that year.

Following her commissioning, Yat Sen did not see her first regular military action until late 1933, during the Nineteenth Route Army Uprising. During the Second Sino-Japanese War that broke out in 1937, Yat Sen served as the wartime flagship after the other capital ships in the fleet were severely damaged. On September 25, she was attacked by the Japanese 2nd Combined Air Group. After sustaining a hit to her stern that caused uncontrollable flooding, she was abandoned and subsequently sank in the river.

In 1938, Yat Sen was salvaged by the Japanese and towed to the Japanese mainland for repairs. She was subsequently assigned as a training ship to the Etajima Naval Academy and renamed Atada (阿多田). It was not until after the end of World War II that the ship was returned to Shanghai in August 1946. After returning to the service of the Republic of China government, she was restored to her original name and joined the newly established First Coastal Defense Fleet, serving as the fleet's flagship. During the Yangtze River Crossing campaign in 1949, Yat Sen broke through the blockade on the Yangtze River and retreated to Taiwan. The ship was officially decommissioned in December 1958 and was sold for scrapping the following year.

Ship	Builder	Armament	Armor	Displacement	Propulsion	Cost	Service			
Ship	Builder	Armament	Armor	Displacement	Propulsion	Cost	Laid down	Launched	Commissioned	Fate
Yat Sen (逸仙)	Republic of China Jiangnan Shipyard	1 × 150 mm (6 in)	Unarmored	1,545 t (1,521 long tons)	2 shafts, 3 Thornycroft water-tube boilers, 2 vertical triple-expansion three-cylinder engines, 19 kn (35 km/h; 22 mph), 4,296 ihp (3,204 kW)	1.564 million silver rounds	April 10, 1930	November 12, 1930	May 25, 1931	Sunk by Japanese aircraft on September 25, 1937, she was later salvaged, renamed Atada by the Japanese, and commissioned as the flagship of the Republic of China Navy after World War II eventually scrapped on December 31, 1959

== Ning Hai class ==
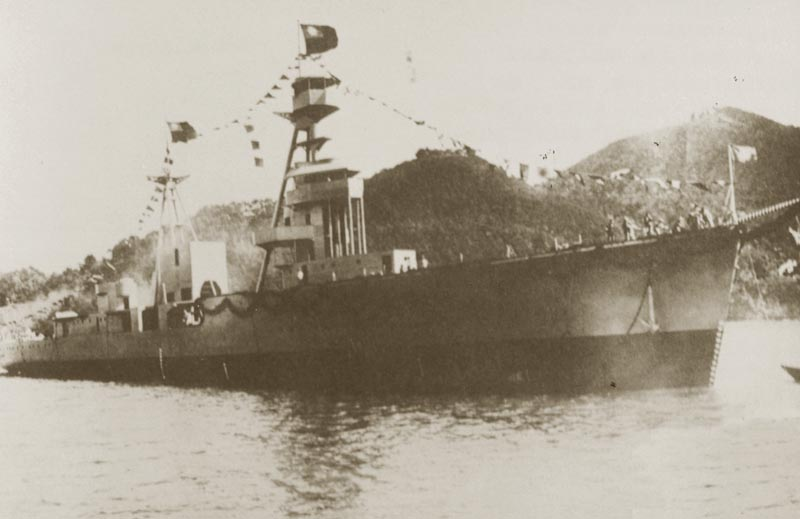
Ning Hai at her launching ceremony

In its joint bid with the Ta Chung Dock & Engineering Works for the Republic of China Navy's Yung Sui (永綏) contract, Harima Shipbuilding established strong connections in China. Upon learning of the Chinese intention to order a new 3,000-ton cruiser, Harima promptly submitted a design proposal and quotation, and actively lobbied through various channels. With the backing of Japanese diplomatic, commercial, and even military circles, as well as high-ranking officials of the Republic of China, Harima's proposal—which was highly aligned with the ROC government's financial capabilities at the time—prevailed over the bid from the British firm Vickers. The basic design of the vessel was finalized jointly by the ROC Ministry of the Navy and the builder by the end of 1929. In December 1930, the two parties officially signed the procurement contract, and the ship was named Ning Hai.

Ning Hai was laid down at the Harima Shipbuilding yards in February 1931. Concurrently, the ROC Ministry of the Navy dispatched a supervisory team of over 50 personnel to the Japanese shipyard for on-site inspection. In terms of design and customization, the vessel was primarily intended to serve as a training platform. Consequently, it was equipped with several features uncommon on Japanese light cruisers, such as a single-seat reconnaissance seaplane. Despite the outbreak of the Mukden incident between China and Japan during the construction phase, the ship was successfully launched in October 1931. Following the signing of the ceasefire agreement between the two nations in May 1932, Ning Hai was officially commissioned into the First Fleet of the Nanjing Nationalist Government's Navy in September of the same year.

Concurrent with the construction of Ning Hai, the ROC Ministry of the Navy commissioned Harima Shipbuilding to design a new vessel based on her, primarily intended to serve as a fleet flagship for command purposes. The ship was constructed by the Jiangnan Dock & Engineering Works, with Harima Shipbuilding providing technical support. On June 28, 1931, Chen Shaokuan personally attended the keel-laying ceremony for the new ship, designated as Hull No. 645, at the Jiangnan Shipyard. The vessel was subsequently officially named Ping Hai. Because its design philosophy emphasized its role as a fleet flagship for direct combat command, Ping Hai featured significant differences from Ning Hai in both her superstructure and armament. The hangar originally intended for the seaplane on Ning Hai was omitted in Ping Hai, which also resulted in a lower overall center of gravity for the latter.

Due to the successive outbreaks of the Mukden Incident and the January 28 incident shortly after her keel was laid, the construction of Ping Hai was temporarily suspended. Work did not resume until Ning Hai was completed and returned to China. Prompted by the stability issues caused by a high center of gravity, which were exposed during the Japanese Navy's Tomozoru incident in 1934, Ping Hai underwent immediate design modifications to enhance her hull stability. It was not until September 1935 that Ping Hai was launched and proceeded with further outfitting. In October of the following year, the vessel was sent to Harima Shipbuilding for the installation of her armament and additional technical equipment. In April 1937, Ping Hai was commissioned at the Jiangnan Shipyard, officially joining the Chinese Navy and replacing Ning Hai as the flagship of the First Fleet.

Following their commissioning, both vessels were stationed near the capital, Nanjing. Along with several other gunboats, they formed a defensive force aimed at blocking Japanese naval forces from advancing up the Yangtze River. During the Battle of Jiangyin, Ning Hai ran aground at Bawei Port in Jingjiang under concentrated Japanese attacks. Ping Hai was struck by a second wave of Japanese aircraft at Shi'erwei in Zhenjiang, ultimately causing her to capsize. Subsequently, both ships were captured, salvaged by the Japanese, and towed to the Sasebo Naval Arsenal and Harima Shipbuilding, respectively. After five years of being laid up, Ping Hai and Ning Hai were rearmed and refitted by the Kure Naval Arsenal and Harima Shipbuilding, respectively. The modified Ning Hai was renamed Ioshima, while Ping Hai was renamed Yasoshima, serving as the flagship for the Japanese escort convoy fleet. Ioshima was eventually torpedoed and sunk by the USS Shad on September 19, 1944, 60 nautical miles south of Omaezaki, Honshu, and was struck from the Imperial Japanese Navy register in November of the same year. Yasoshima was bombed and sunk by U.S. carrier-based aircraft in Santa Cruz Bay, Luzon, on November 25, 1944, and was struck from the register in January 1945.

Ship	Builder	Armament	Armor	Displacement	Propulsion	Cost	Service			
Ship	Builder	Armament	Armor	Displacement	Propulsion	Cost	Laid down	Launched	Commissioned	Fate
Ning Hai (甯海)	Japan Harima	3 × twin 140 mm (6 in)	25 mm (1 in)	2,600 t (2,559 long tons)	3 shafts, 4 Kampon-type coal-oil mixed water-tube boilers, 1 four-cylinder triple-expansion reciprocating engine, 30 kn (56 km/h; 35 mph), 10,500 ihp (7,800 kW)	4.32 million yen (Note: Other sources record the total cost as 7,642,620 Chinese national currency, including the expenses of the supervision team.)	February 20, 1931 (Note: Other sources record the date as February 21, 1931.)	October 10, 1931	June 1931 (Note: Other sources record the date as "September 1, 1932")	Sunk by Japanese aircraft at Jiangyin on September 23, 1937 later be salvaged and converted into the Japanese as Ioshima Ultimately be torpedoed and sunk by USS Shad at 60 nautical miles south of Omaezaki, Honshu, on September 19, 1944
Ping Hai (平海)	Republic of China Jiangnan Shipyard	3 × 140 mm (6 in)	25 mm (1 in)	2,400 t (2,362 long tons)	2 shafts, 4 Kampon-type coal-fired boilers, one oil-fired boiler, two triple-expansion reciprocating engines, 25 kn (46 km/h; 29 mph), (Note: Other sources record the speed as 21.256 knots.) 7,427 ihp (5,538 kW) (Note: Other sources record the output as 7,488 horsepower.)	7.64262 million fabi	June 28, 1931	September 28, 1935	April 1, 1937	Damaged by Japanese aircraft and run aground on September 23, 1937, later be salvaged and commissioned into the Wang Jingwei regime's navy be taken over by the Allies after WWII (Note: Other sources record that she was salvaged, converted, and renamed Yasoshima by the Japanese, before being sunk by US forces near Santa Cruz Bay, Luzon, on November 25, 1944.)

== Chong Qing ==
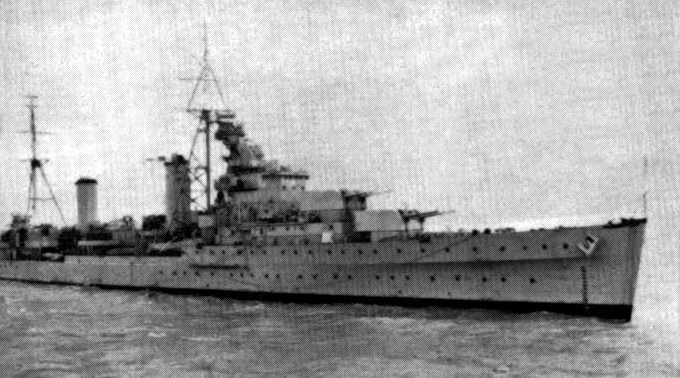
Chong Qing in 1948

HMS Aurora, the fourth vessel of the Royal Navy's Arethusa-class light cruisers, was also translated into Chinese as "Zhendan" or "Goddess of Dawn". She was the eighth ship in the Royal Navy to bear the name "Aurora", and saw action in numerous engagements, including the pursuit of the German battleship Bismarck. She also served as the flagship of the Royal Navy's Mediterranean K Force. In August 1945, the British government decided to gift the vessel to China as compensation. This decision was made after the six customs patrol boats originally left by the Chinese side to British-administered Hong Kong were sunk during the Second Sino-Japanese War.

To prepare for the handover of the vessel, the ROC Navy dispatched a contingent of officers and sailors to the United Kingdom for specialized training between 1942 and 1946. On May 19, 1948, a formal handover ceremony for the cruiser Chong Qing and the destroyer Ling Fu was held in Portsmouth, officially transferring the ships to the Chinese delegation. The two vessels set sail on May 26 and, after an 80-day voyage, arrived in Nanjing on August 14. From October 5 to November 3, the Chong Qing, under the command of Gui Yongqing, bombarded Tashan. However, on February 25 of the following year, Captain Deng Zhaoxiang led the entire crew in a mutiny at the mouth of the Huangpu River, arriving the next day at the port of Yantai, which was under the control of the People's Liberation Army. Consequently, she became the first cruiser to serve in the PLA fleet. On March 4, the ship arrived at Huludao and came under the command of Zhu Jun, then Commander of the Western Liaoning Military Region. Two weeks later, B-24 bombers bearing U.S. military insignia took off from Qingdao and subjected the Chong Qing to four consecutive days of bombing in the Bohai Sea off Huludao. The cruiser was ultimately crippled by the bombings on the 19th and was ordered to be scuttled the following day.

After the war, the vessel was salvaged and repaired in 1951 and was subsequently renamed Pei Ching (北京). (Note: Other sources record that the vessel was not salvaged until November 1959, when it was renamed Huang He (黄河).) She was later converted into a floating pier and was ultimately scrapped in the 1960s. (Note: Other sources record that it was scrapped in the 1990s.)

Ship	Builder	Armament	Armor	Displacement (upon transfer to the Republic of China Navy)	Propulsion	Cost	Service			
Ship	Builder	Armament	Armor	Displacement (upon transfer to the Republic of China Navy)	Propulsion	Cost	Laid down	Launched	Commissioned	Fate
Chong Qing (重慶)	United Kingdom Portsmouth Dockyard	3 × twin 152 mm (6 in)	70 mm (3 in)	5,270 t (5,187 long tons) (standard) 6,665 t (6,560 long tons) (full) (Note: Other sources record the displacement as 7,500 tons.)	4 shafts, 4naval-type oil-fired three-cylinder water-tube boilers, 4 Parsons-geared turbine, (Note: Other sources record the number as three units.) 32.25 kn (59.73 km/h; 37.11 mph), (Note: Other sources record the speed as 32 knots (59 km/h; 37 mph).) 6,400 ihp (4,800 kW)	£2,259,951, as a gift from the British Royal Navy to the Republic of China Navy	July 23, 1935 (Note: Other sources record the date as "June 23, 1935")	August 20, 1936	May 19, 1948	defected to the People's Liberation Army Navy (PLAN) on February 26, 1949 be decommissioned in 1954, and was scrapped in the 1960s

== See also ==
- List of ships of the Chinese Navy (1644–1945)
- List of Republic of China Navy ships
- List of ships of the People's Liberation Army Navy
