= John Anderson Moore =

American World War II submarine commander (1910–1944)

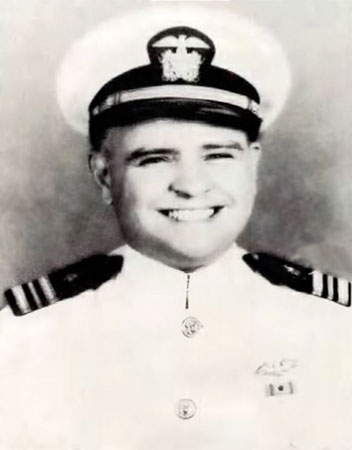
- Born: January 12, 1910; Brownwood, Texas, U.S.
- Died: February 26, 1944 (aged 34); 25° 47'N x 128° 45'E, S. of Okinawa Island †
- Burial place: Manila American Cemetery and Memorial
- Military career
- Allegiance: United States of America
- Branch: United States Navy
- Service years: 1932–1944
- Rank: Commander
- Commands: USS Grayback
- Conflicts: East China Sea
- Awards: Navy Cross (3); Purple Heart Medal

John Anderson Moore (January 12, 1910 – February 26, 1944) was a United States Navy submarine commander who was killed in action during World War II. He had been awarded three Navy Crosses and a Purple Heart Medal before his death. The U.S. Navy frigate USS John A. Moore (FFG-19) is named in his honor.

Raised in Bisbee, Arizona, Moore had boxed and played soccer at the United States Naval Academy. He served on R- and S-class submarines, before assuming command of the submarine USS Grayback on its last three patrols during 1943–1944. Under the overall command of innovator Charles "Swede" Momsen, Grayback, Cero, and Shad launched the U.S. Navy's first attack against enemy shipping using "wolfpack" tactics. Moore was credited with multiple events of "extraordinary heroism" in repeated forays against Japanese vessels in the East China Sea before being killed during the last of the Grayback's patrols.
