= Chinese cruiser Yat Sen =

Chinese Navy warship

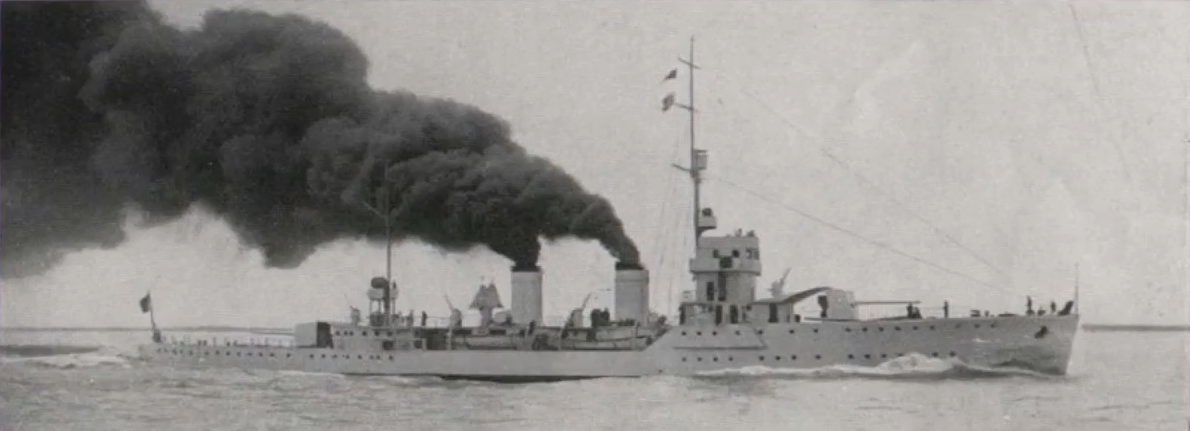
- The chinese light cruiser Yat Sen in early 1930s.

History

Republic of China
- Name: Yat Sen /Yi Xian
- Namesake: Sun Yat-sen, founding father of the Republic of China
- Builder: Jiangnan Dock and Engineering Works, Shanghai, China
- Launched: November 12th,1931
- Commissioned: October 10, 1934
- Decommissioned: June 1, 1958
- Fate: Sold for scrapping, 19 May 1959

General characteristics
- Type: Light cruiser
- Displacement: 1,650 t (1,624 long tons)
- Length: 270 ft (82 m)
- Beam: 34 ft (10 m)
- Draught: 12.4 ft (3.8 m)
- Propulsion: Two-shaft Reciprocating Engines; 3 coal-fire boilers; 4,000 shp (3,000 kW)
- Speed: 19 knots (22 mph; 35 km/h)
- Complement: 182
- Armament: As Built; 1 × 149 mm (6 in) HIH Siderius gun No. 8 L50; 1 × 140 mm (5.5 in) 3rd Year Type gun; 4 × 75 mm (3 in) Krupp AA guns; 1 × 47 mm (1.85 in) rapid fire gun; After Japanese Reconstruction; 1 × 120 mm (4.7 in) DP gun; 2 × twin 40 mm (1.6 in) Type 91 "HI" guns; 5 × 25 mm Type 96 AA guns; 6 × 7.7 mm machine guns

Yat Sen (Chinese: 逸仙; pinyin: Yixian), named after the founding father Sun Yat-sen of the Republic of China and completed in 1931, was a light cruiser— having more in common with the small cruisers of pre–World War I era—in the ROC Navy before World War II. An enlarged design was laid down but never completed due to the Japanese occupation of Jiangnan shipyard.

== Service record ==
Yat Sen was launched and began its sea trials in 1931. On August 5, 1933,Yat Sen received orders to move to the Bohai Sea for patrolling missions. Yat Sen later headed to Fujian when the 19th Route Army rebelled there. In 1936, Yat Sen was ordered to keep a close eye on Japanese ships drilling near Fuzhou and showed a strong mobility on the sea during the progress. After the Second Sino-Japanese War broke out, Yat Sen participated in the defense of Jiangyin Fortress, Yangtze River, near Nanjing and took over flagship duties after both Ning Hai and Ping Hai were sunk by Japanese aircraft. Yat Sen was sunk as well on 25 September 1937 after shooting down two of the 16 attacking aircraft, losing 14 of its crew.

The Japanese salvaged the ship after the fall of Jiangyin Fortress. After having its stern deck added by one level and receiving radar, sonar, and Japanese weapons, it was renamed Atada (阿多田) and employed as a training ship for naval academy cadets destined for submarine service. It survived World War II and was returned to its former owner on 9 August 1946. Before its departure, however, the Japanese installed all the German-made wooden furniture taken from the armored cruiser Yakumo (which by then had been sold for scrapping) into its cabins.

After reverting to its old name (逸仙) and rejoining the ROCN, Yat Sen / Yi Xian remained active during the Chinese Civil War and the ROC government's subsequent withdrawal to Taiwan. It participated in numerous patrol cruises but was not involved in any major action until being decommissioned on 1 June 1958 and sold for scrapping on 19 May the following year.
