= Ioshima-class cruiser =

Chinese and Japanese navy ship class

Class overview
- Name: Ioshima class cruiser
- Builders: Harima Dock Co., Ltd. (Ioshima), Jiangnan Shipyard (Yasoshima)
- Operators: Imperial Japanese Navy
- Planned: 2
- Completed: 2
- Lost: 2

General characteristics
- Type: Escort vessel
- Length: 360 ft (110 m)
- Beam: 39 ft (12 m)
- Draught: 13 ft (4.0 m)
- Speed: 21-23kt
- Range: 5,000 nmi (9,300 km) at 12 kn (14 mph; 22 km/h)
- Armament: 2 × 12 cm (4.7 in)/45 10th Year Type; 5 × triple 25 mm (0.98 in)/60 Type 96 AA guns; Several machine guns; 2 × depth charge racks

The Ioshima-class escort ship (五百島型海防艦) also called Yasoshima-class light cruiser (second class cruiser) (八十島型軽巡洋艦（二等巡洋艦）) were a pair of escort ships reconstructed from former Republic of China Navy Ning Hai class cruisers that were sunk during earlier battles- Ioshima (五百島) from Ning Hai and Yasoshima (八十島) from Ping Hai - these ships were salvageable as river water doesn't corrode sunken hulls as badly as sea water would. Originally they were to be transferred to the puppet government of Wang Jing-Wei, but instead of honoring the agreement, the Japanese seized and outfitted them first as barracks hulks and ultimately to their final form in 1944.

Since they were built on the same design from the start (just by two different builders), the reconstruction brought them to a more-or-less common standard: old armaments and fire control platforms were removed; aft superstructures (including the seaplane facility aboard the former Ning Hai) were replaced with bigger ones mounting boat handling cranes and a raised main gun position, and search radar sets were installed. Their new armaments (secondary rifles passed from modernised cruisers and 25mm machine cannons), while seemingly lighter, were dual-purpose weapons more-suitable against contemporary aircraft.

Both Isoshima and Yasoshima were sunk by late 1944.

== Ning Hai-class cruiser ==
The Ning Hai-class cruisers were a pair of light cruisers in the Chinese fleet before World War II. Ning Hai (Chinese: 甯海; lit. 'Peaceful Seas'), the lead ship of the class, was laid down in Japan while the follow-on, Ping Hai (Chinese: 平海; lit. 'Amicable Seas'), was laid down in China and completed with Japanese assistance to a slightly modified design that included the deletion of seaplane facilities (Ning Hai had a small hangar for two seaplanes). While Ning Hai was quickly commissioned, tensions between China and Japan plagued the efforts to complete Ping Hai. Both served as flagships of the Republic of China Navy (ROCN), with Ping Hai taking over the role from its older sister ship since April 1937. The ROCN had an ambitious plan to procure a larger and more-powerful command cruiser and then to reassign the two vessels as scouts/flagships of submarine flotillas, but the outbreak of war with Japan put an end to all related efforts (including the acquisition of submarines).

Ning Hai and Ping Hai were sunk in defense of the Kiangyin Fortress, Yangtze River, near Nanking by Japanese aircraft (of which the two ships shot down four) on 23 September 1937, but then refloated by the Japanese. Originally they were to be transferred to the puppet government of Wang Jing-Wei, but the Japanese then had a change of heart and outfitted them first as barracks hulks and ultimately as escort ships Ioshima (Ning Hai) and Yasoshima (Ping Hai) in 1944.

=== Design ===
The Ning Hai class were a compact cruiser design, with the main armament of six 140 mm (5.5 in) guns in three twin turrets giving each ship the same broadside as the Japanese cruiser Yūbari at around half the cost. The lead ship of the class Ning Hai also had a small hangar for two single-seat floatplanes, a Japanese-built Aichi AB-3 and a similar aircraft of local design, the Naval Air Establishment Ning Hai.

The Ning Hai class did have a number of drawbacks. Their high centres of gravity, a common flaw to numerous Japanese-designed warships of the era, made the ships unstable in heavy seas. Their use of obsolescent triple-expansion engines, dictated by building cost considerations, kept their maximum speed at around 21–23 knots (39–43 km/h; 24–26 mph). Given the ships' primary role as coastal defence ships, these were probably acceptable trade-offs.

== Ships ==
Name	Builder	Acquired	(Re)commissioned	Fate
Ning Hai	Harima Dock Co., Ltd.	20 February 1931	10 October 1931	Sunk in Yangtze River on 23 September 1937 by Japanese aircraft
Ping Hai	Kiangnan Dock and Engineering Works	28 June 1931	28 September 1935	Sunk in Yangtze River on 23 September 1937 by Japanese aircraft
Ioshima (ex-Ning Hai)	Harima Dock Co., Ltd.	1938	June 28, 1944	Sunk by USS Shad on September 19, 1944
Yasoshima (ex-Ping Hai)	Kiangnan Dock and Engineering Works	1938	September 25, 1944	Sunk by US Navy Aircraft on November 25, 1944

== Bibliography ==
- Lacroix, Eric & Wells II, Linton (1997). Japanese Cruisers of the Pacific War. Annapolis, Maryland: Naval Institute Press. ISBN 0-87021-311-3.
