= USS John A. Moore =

1979 Oliver Hazard Perry-class frigate

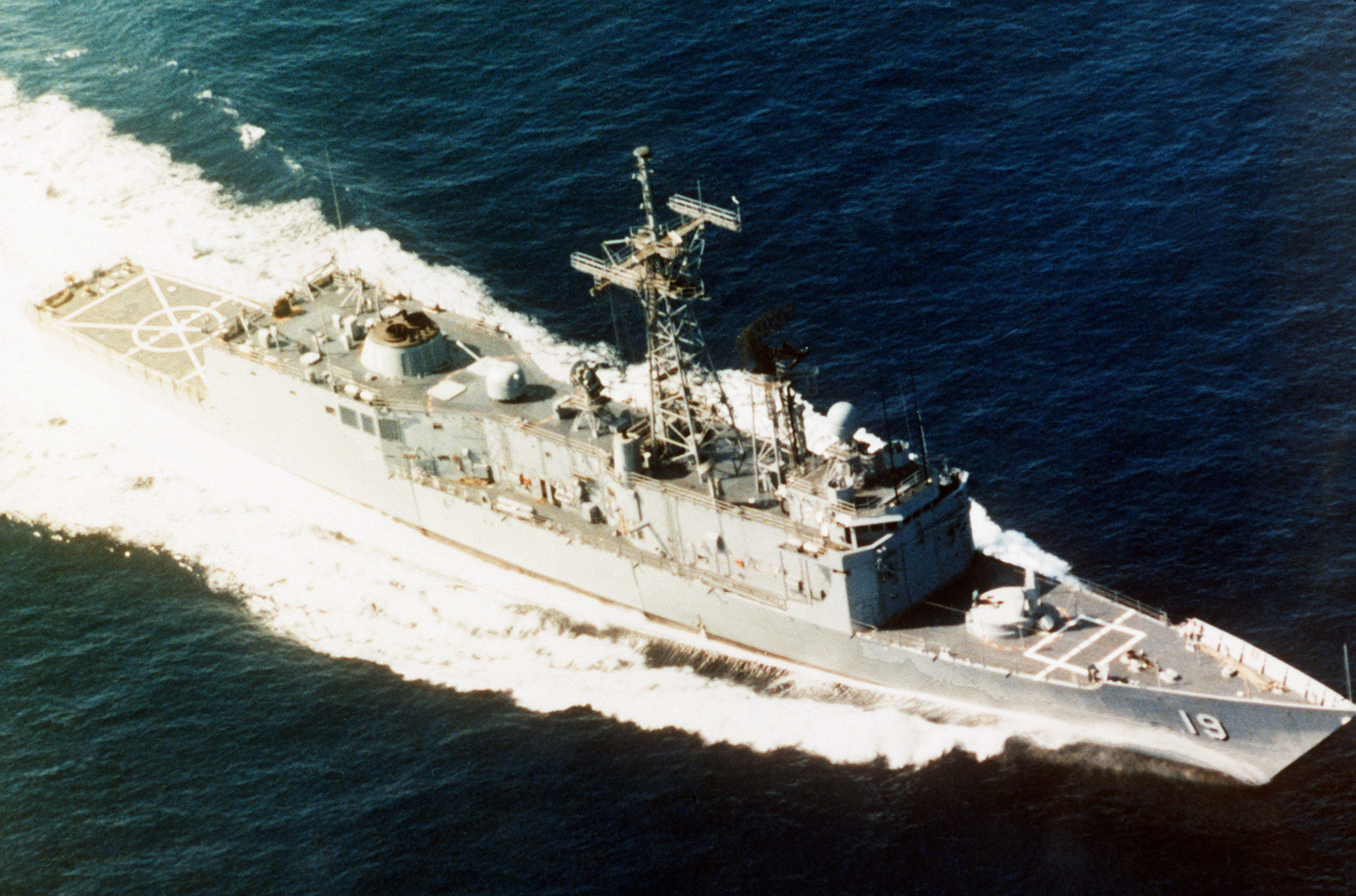
- USS John A Moore (FFG-19)

History

United States
- Name: John A. Moore
- Namesake: Commander John Anderson Moore
- Ordered: 28 February 1977
- Builder: Todd Pacific Shipyards, Los Angeles Division, San Pedro, CA
- Laid down: 19 December 1978
- Launched: 20 October 1979
- Commissioned: 14 November 1981
- Decommissioned: 1 September 2000
- Stricken: 1 September 2000
- Home port: San Diego, California (former)
- Identification: Hull symbol:FFG-19; Code letters:NJAM
- Motto: "Never Give In"
- Fate: Disposed of through the Security Assistance Program (SAP)
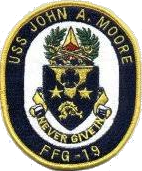
- Badge

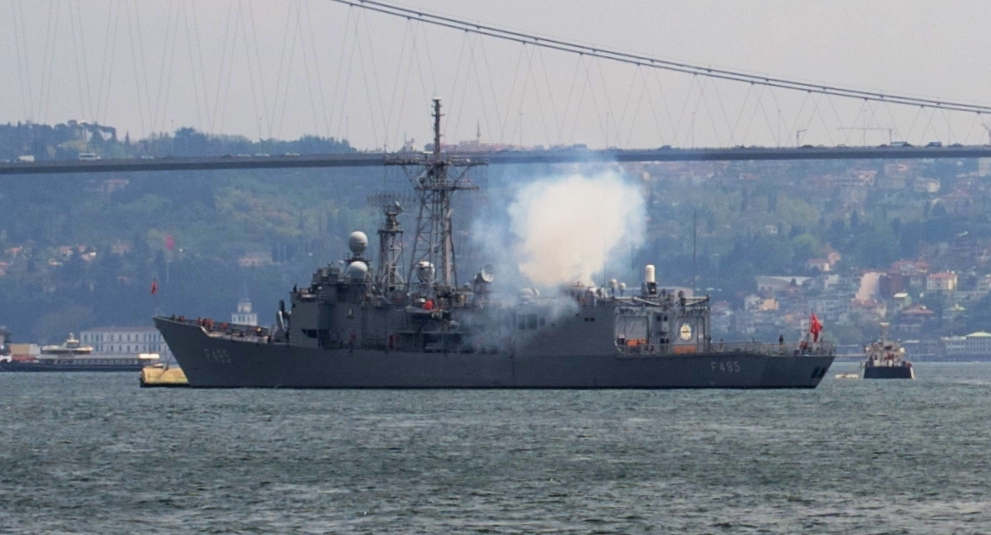
- TCG Gediz (F-495) in Istanbul 2009

Turkey
- Name: Gediz
- Namesake: District of Gediz, Kütahya
- Identification: F 495
- Status: in active service

General characteristics
- Class & type: Oliver Hazard Perry-class frigate
- Displacement: 4,100 long tons (4,200 t), full load
- Length: 445 feet (136 m), overall
- Beam: 45 feet (14 m)
- Draught: 22 feet (6.7 m)
- Propulsion: 2 × General Electric LM2500-30 gas turbines generating 41,000 shp (31 MW) through a single shaft and variable pitch propeller; 2 × Auxiliary Propulsion Units, 350 hp (260 kW) retractable electric azimuth thrusters for maneuvering and docking.
- Speed: over 29 knots (54 km/h)
- Range: 5,000 nautical miles at 18 knots (9,300 km at 33 km/h)
- Complement: 15 officers and 190 enlisted, plus SH-60 LAMPS detachment of roughly six officer pilots and 15 enlisted maintainers
- Sensors & processing systems: AN/SPS-49 air-search radar; AN/SPS-55 surface-search radar; CAS and STIR fire-control radar; AN/SQS-56 sonar.; G-Class Frigate: Combat Management System: GENESIS (Gemi Entegre Savaş İdare Sistemi); Search radar: SMART-S Mk2
- Electronic warfare & decoys: AN/SLQ-32
- Armament: As built: 1 × OTO Melara Mk 75 76 mm/62 caliber naval gun; 2 × Mk 32 triple-tube (324 mm) launchers for Mark 46 torpedoes; 1 × Vulcan Phalanx CIWS; 4 × .50-cal (12.7 mm) machine guns.; 1 × Mk 13 Mod 4 single-arm launcher for Harpoon anti-ship missiles and SM-1MR Standard anti-ship/air missiles (40 round magazine); Note: As of 2004, Mk 13 systems removed from all active US vessels of this class.; G-Class Frigate: 1 × Mk 15 Phalanx CIWS; 1 × Oto Melara 76mm DP gun; 8 × Harpoon SSM; 40 × SM-1 MR SAM; 32 × ESSM launched from Mk-41 VLS (4 ESSM missiles per MK-41 cell through the use of MK25 Quadpack canisters, total of 8 cells); Two triple Mark 32 Anti-submarine warfare torpedo tubes with Mark 46 or Mark 50 anti-submarine warfare torpedoes
- Aircraft carried: 1 × SH-2F LAMPS I

USS John A. Moore (FFG-19), eleventh ship of the Oliver Hazard Perry class of guided-missile frigates, was named for Commander John Anderson Moore (1910–1944). Ordered from Todd Pacific Shipyards, Los Angeles Division, San Pedro, California on 28 February 1977 as part of the FY77 program, John A. Moore was laid down on 19 September 1978, launched on 20 October 1979, and commissioned on 14 November 1981.

John A. Moore was the first ship of that name in the US Navy. The namesake was commanding officer of the submarine USS Grayback (SS-208) in 1943 and 1944. Cdr. Moore received three awards of the Navy Cross during his command, the last posthumously after Grayback was sunk in February 1944.

== TCG Gediz (F 495) ==
Decommissioned and stricken on 1 September 2000, she was transferred to Turkey as that nation's TCG Gediz (F 495). As of 2015, she is still active in the service of the Turkish Navy. TCG Gediz (F 495) went through major modernisation and was redesignated as a Gabya-class frigate (G-class).

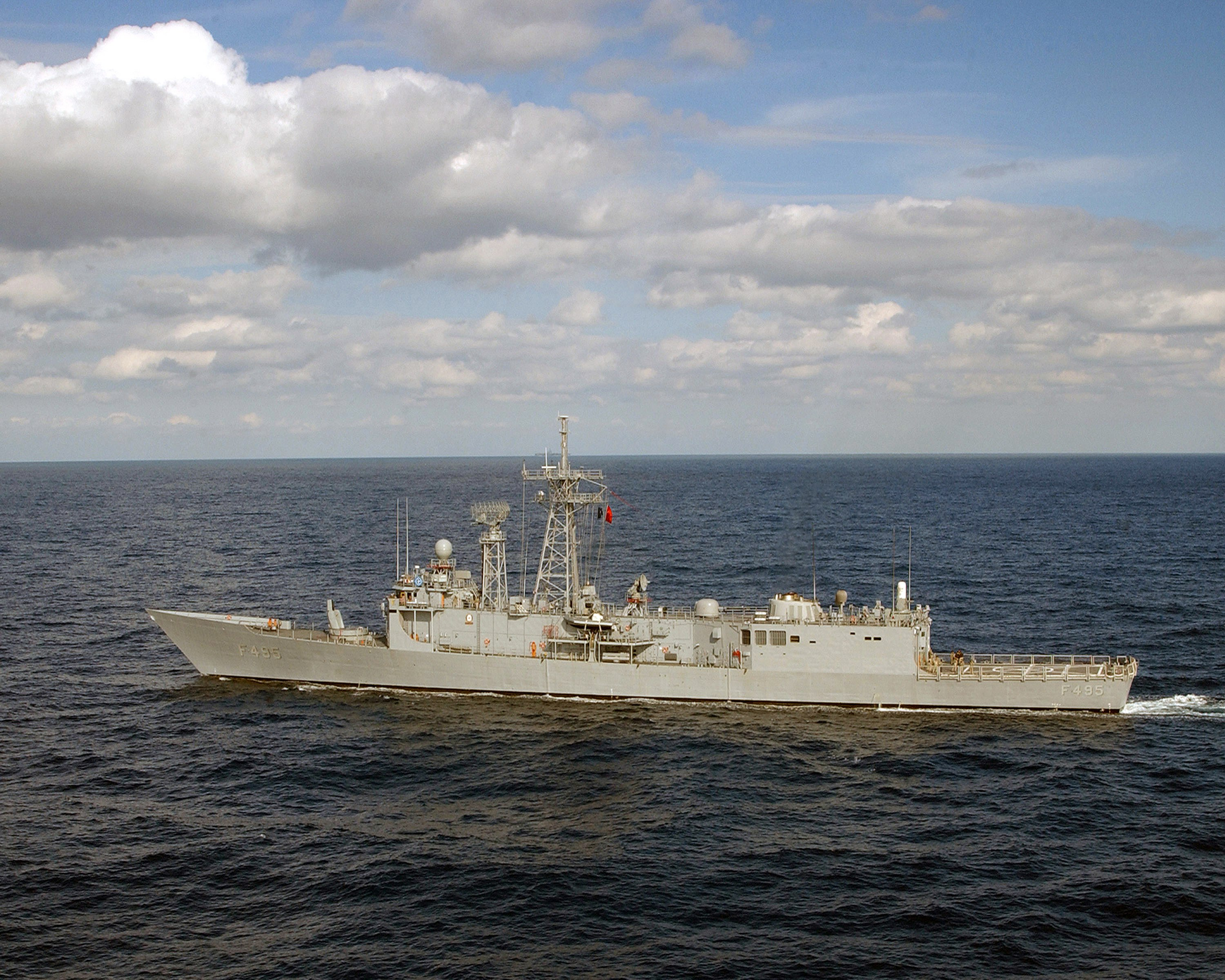
Gediz

== In other media ==
On the TV show MacGyver Season 1, Episode 11, the ship is visible in the opening scene, at the outfitting pier of Todd Pacific shipyard, along with two other FFG 7 ships under construction.

On the TV show JAG the ship was used multiple times. It was used in season 3 episode "Tiger, Tiger", where the ship played the part of a fictional frigate USS Stockdale (FFG-62). In the season 5, episode 7 "Rogue" the ship played the fictional frigate USS Ellyson (FFG-19).

In the TV show NCIS Episode 24 in Season 3 the ship is seen listed on a video monitor as FFG-19 when the Cape Fear Container Ship blows up.
