= Charles Momsen =

US Navy admiral, submarine rescue (1896–1967)

Charles Bowers Momsen
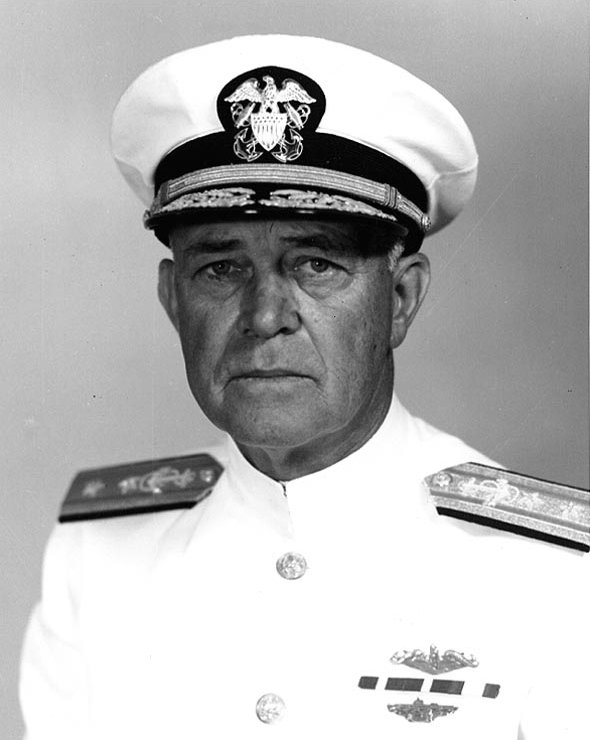
- Born: June 21, 1896; Flushing, New York, U.S.
- Died: May 25, 1967 (aged 70); St. Petersburg, Florida, U.S.
- Burial place: Arlington National Cemetery
- Military career
- Allegiance: United States
- Branch: United States Navy
- Service years: 1916–1955
- Rank: Vice admiral
- Nickname: "Swede"
- Commands: O-15 (SS-76); S-1 (SS-105); South Dakota
- Conflicts: World War II; Pacific War
- Awards: Navy Cross; Navy Distinguished Service Medal; Legion of Merit

Charles Bowers Momsen (June 21, 1896 – May 25, 1967), nicknamed "Swede", was born in Flushing, New York. He was an American pioneer in submarine rescue for the United States Navy, and he invented the underwater escape device later called the "Momsen lung", for which he received the Navy Distinguished Service Medal in 1929. In May 1939, Momsen directed the rescue of the crew of Squalus (SS-192).

== Early years in the Navy ==
Momsen entered the U.S. Naval Academy in 1914, but he was dismissed after a widespread cheating scandal during the spring of his first year there. However, Momsen pursued another appointment to the Academy, received it, repeated his plebe year, and graduated in 1919 — one year early, due to the involvement of the United States in World War I.

From 1919 to 1921, Momsen served on the battleship Oklahoma. In 1921, he entered the Naval Submarine School in New London, Connecticut, graduating in January 1922. Eighteen months later, he took command of the submarine O-15 (SS-76). A few years later, he was given command of S-1 (SS-105), one of the newest US Navy designed submarines of that time.

== Diving and rescue ==
=== Early interest ===
It was aboard S-1 Momsen's attention became drawn to the urgent need for a way to rescue trapped submariners.

On September 25, 1925, S-1's sister ship, S-51 (SS-162), collided with freighter City of Rome in the vicinity of Block Island and sank in 130 feet (40 m) of water. Momsen was ordered to take S-1 to search for the crippled submarine. S-1 found the oil slick marking the spot where S-51 had sunk, but without any sonar, there was no way for his crew to locate her on the bottom, nor was there a way for trapped crewmen to escape.

Momsen began to look for ways to rescue submariners. He conceived a diving bell, which could be lowered to a submarine in distress, mated to an escape hatch, and opened to allow trapped submariners to climb in. A watertight seal to the submarine could be achieved by placing a rubber gasket around the diving bell's bottom and reducing the air pressure once the bell was over the escape hatch. Then, the hatch could be opened, and the trapped submariners could climb aboard.

Momsen diagrammed his idea and sent it up the chain of command. He waited more than a year for a response, heard nothing, and concluded there must have been something technically wrong with the concept.

Momsen's next tour of duty took him to the Submarine Division of the Bureau of Construction and Repair. Shortly after he reported aboard, he came across his diving bell drawings. They had been disapproved as impractical. He stated his case again, but to no avail.

Shortly thereafter, in December 1927, another submarine, the S-4 (SS-109), sank off Cape Cod. All forty of her crew died. Six sailors survived three days in the forward torpedo room, but had no way to escape.

=== The Momsen lung ===
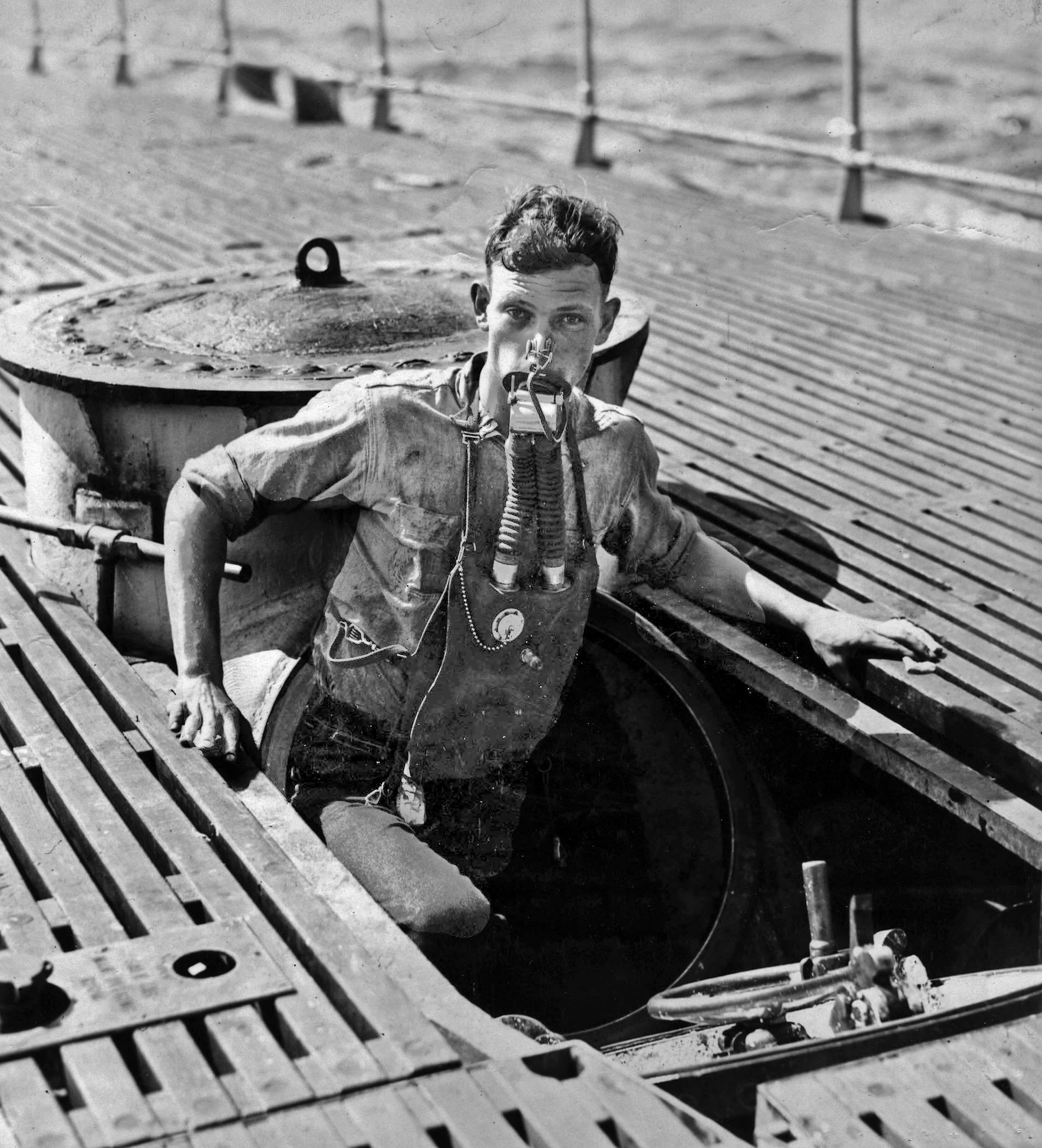
V-5 crewman A. L. Rosenkotter exits the submarine's forward escape trunk wearing a "Momsen lung" during the submarine's sea trials in July 1930.

After the 1927 S-4 incident, Momsen began working on a device to help trapped submariners escape safely to the surface. Officially called the Submarine Escape Lung, it consisted of an oblong rubber bag that recycled exhaled air. This idea has been patented and tested by Henry Fleuss since 1879. German submarines had those Tauchretter as standard issue since 1912. The local press enthusiastically received the "new" device and they dubbed it the "Momsen lung", a name that stuck in the US.

The Momsen lung contains a canister of soda lime, which removes poisonous carbon dioxide from the exhaled air and then replenishes the air with oxygen. Two tubes lead from the bag to a mouthpiece: one with which to inhale air and the other with which to exhale spent air. The device hangs around the wearer's neck and is strapped around the waist. Besides providing oxygen for the ascent, it also allows a submariner to rise slowly to the surface, thus avoiding embolisms.

Between June 1929 and September 1932, Lieutenant Momsen developed the lung along with Chief Gunner's Mate Clarence L. Tibbals and Frank M. Hobson, a civilian employee of the Bureau of Construction and Repair (later the Bureau of Ships). In 1929, Momsen received the Navy Distinguished Service Medal for personally testing the device at a depth of 200 feet (61 m).

The Momsen lung saved its first lives in October 1944, when eight submariners used it to reach the surface after Tang (SS-306) sank in 180 feet (55 m) of water in the East China Sea.

The Momsen lung was eventually supplemented by the Steinke hood and free-ascent techniques.

== The diving bell ==
Momsen returned to his diving bell idea in 1930. He built a prototype, constructed from a water-tight aircraft hangar pirated from S-1 and tested it off Key West, Florida. Momsen stated the bell was unstable, tipped, and leaked, and had several changes in mind for the diving bell, but was sent to the Bureau of Construction and Repair to teach submariners how to use the Momsen lung before he could make the changes. He charged Lieutenant Commander Al McCann to make the changes he wanted and McCann was put in charge of the final revisions on the Momsen / McCann diving bell. When the redesigned diving bell was completed in late 1930, it was introduced as the McCann Submarine Rescue Chamber. The final bell, with the revisions and changes that Momsen authorized, included a floor bulkhead, pneumatic winch and a pressure seal allowing direct transfer of survivors to the diving bell in a dry environment.

=== Gas mixtures ===
From 1937 to 1939, Momsen led an experimental deep-sea diving unit at the Washington Navy Yard which achieved a major breakthrough in the physiology of the human lung's gas mixtures under high pressure. At depths greater than 60 ft (18 m), on pure oxygen, and 270 ft (82 m), on air, the oxygen turns toxic. Underwater, breathing air, nitrogen enters the blood, then tissues, and below 100 ft (30 m) may cause euphoria commonly called "nitrogen narcosis". Also, divers who ascend too rapidly can get decompression sickness, commonly known as "the bends," which happens when nitrogen in the blood forms bubbles. These bubbles can block blood flow and cause intense pain, even death.

In experiments often performed by Momsen himself, the team replaced the nitrogen with nontoxic helium and mixed it with varying levels of oxygen depending on the depth. Today's divers use the knowledge to operate safely deeper than 300 feet (91 m).

== The Squalus rescue ==
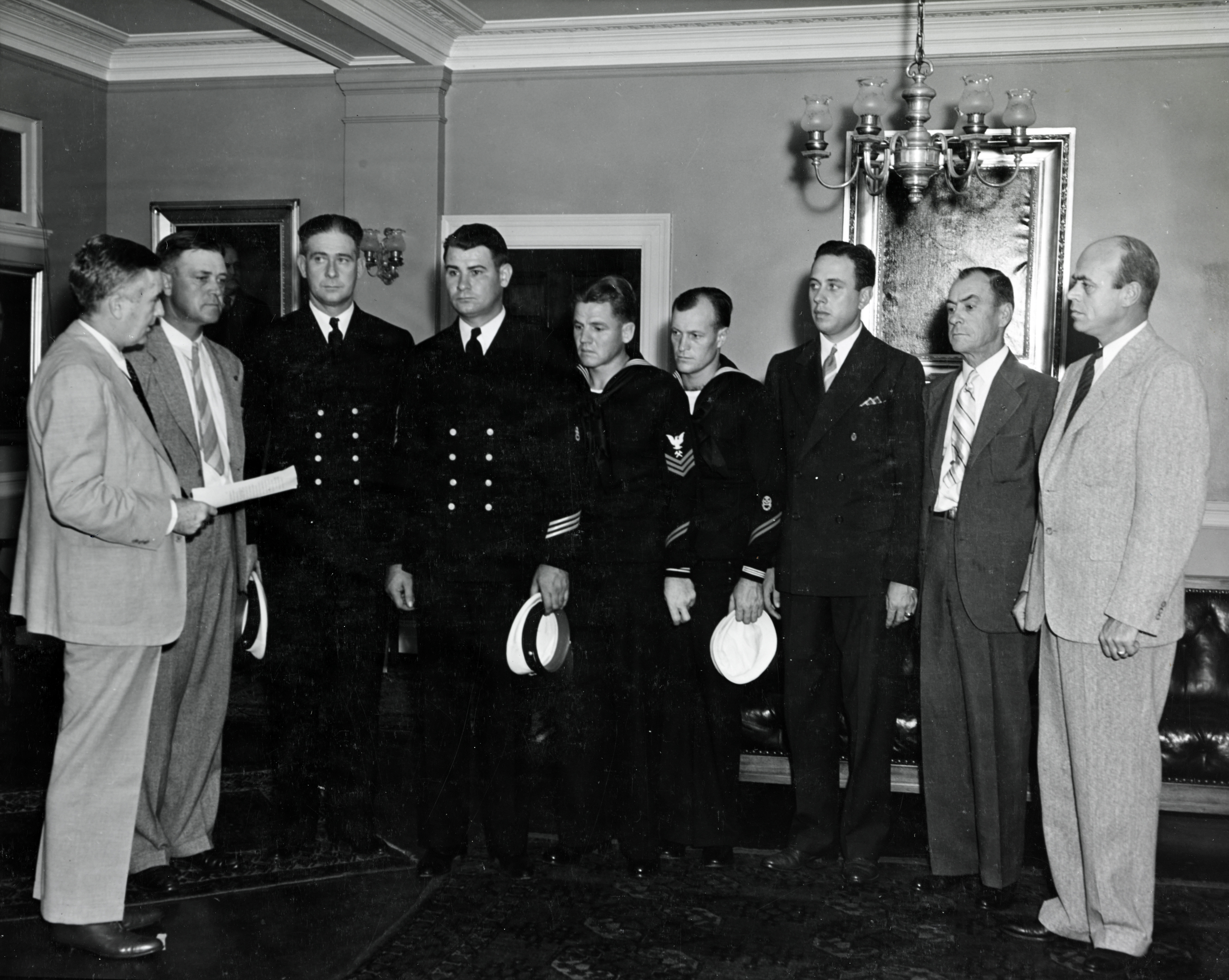
Acting Secretary of the Navy Charles Edison (left) reads a letter of commendation from President Franklin D. Roosevelt to several members of the USS Squalus salvage unit in his Navy Department offices, September 16, 1939. Commander Momsen is second from left.

Momsen, already famous for the invention of his Momsen lung, achieved even more fame for directing the rescue and recovery of the 33 crewmen of the submarine Squalus, which sank in May 1939 in 243 feet (74 m) of water off the Isles of Shoals, New Hampshire. Working from the submarine rescue ship USS Falcon (ASR-2), Momsen instructed the team of deep-sea divers as they dived to the submarine and attached cables to the rescue chamber. He also supervised rescue chamber operators as it made four dives to bring the submariners to the surface and a fifth to check the flooded aft section for survivors. The fourth dive was marred by a cable jam, and the chamber had to be hauled to the surface by hand over hand pulling by all on board. All 33 surviving crewmen were rescued. Twenty-six men had perished.

Momsen led the diving operations in the effort to salvage the Squalus, which took 113 days. She was taken to the drydock at the Portsmouth Navy Yard.

Along with Commander McCann, Momsen received a letter of commendation from President Franklin D. Roosevelt for the successful rescue of the crewmen from the Squalus and the subsequent salvage of the submarine. After her repairs, the Squalus was renamed the USS Sailfish, and the name Squalus was never used by the U.S. Navy again.

== World War II ==
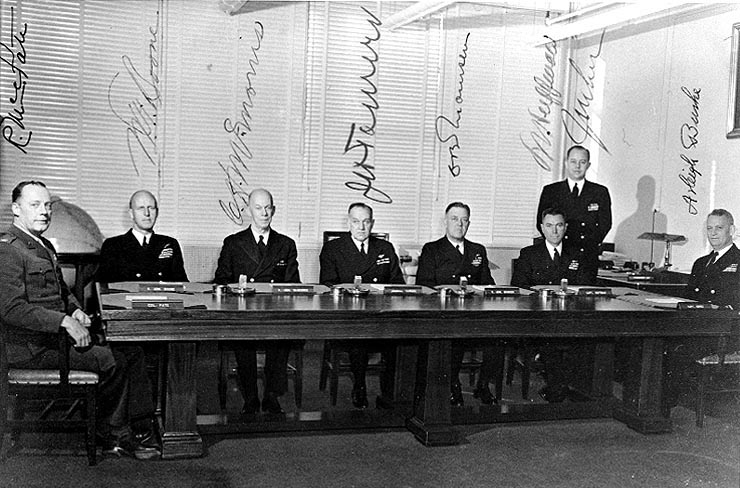
The General Board of the U.S. Navy in November 1947. From left to right: Colonel Randolph M. Pate; Admiral Walter F. Boone; Admiral Charles H. McMorris; Admiral John H. Towers; Rear Admiral Momsen; Captain Leon J. Huffman; Commander Lee; and Captain Arleigh Burke

During World War II, Momsen served as Commander, Submarine Squadron 2 (ComSubRon 2) and Commander, Submarine Squadron 4 (ComSubRon 4). While Momsen was ComSubRon 2 in the U.S. Pacific Fleet, captains under his command reported their Mark 14 torpedoes were not functioning properly. When fired from the preferred perpendicular angle of impact, the torpedoes did not always explode. However, when fired to hit at acute angles, the torpedoes usually exploded. When officers of Momsen's own squadron complained, he decided to find out why. He took torpedoes to the shallow waters and sheer cliffs of the Hawaiian Island of Kahoolawe and fired until he got a dud. Then, risking his own life, he dove into the water to find the unexploded torpedo. With help, he recovered the dangerous live torpedo and brought it on board. A small problem with the firing pin inside the primer cap of the warhead was causing the duds: it was becoming crushed, rather than firing the warhead.

In Fall 1943, ComSubPac initiated the Navy's first wolfpack. Momsen drilled his captains and their executive officers in tactics, planning to have three boats act in company, one boat making the first attack on a convoy then acting as "trailer", while the other two attacked alternatively on either flank afterward. He also developed a simple code for communications on the short range VHF radio system used for Talk Between Ships (TBS). The pack consisted of Edgar McGregor's Shad, experienced skipper Dave White's new Cero, and Grayback, fresh from refit in Mare Island (and with one of the Submarine Force's first 5 in (127 mm) deck guns), under newcomer John Moore. Momsen, without any combat experience, flew his flag in Cero.

The pack arrived in the East China Sea in October 1943. It proved unable to solve the problems of communication and risk of fratricide, and made only one joint attack on a single convoy, but was credited at the time with sinking five Japanese ships for 88,000 tons and damaging eight others for 63,000 tons between them. (This was reduced to three sunk for 23,500 tons by JANAC postwar.) Momsen also received the Legion of Merit for work on the Navy's wolfpacks from February 1943 to June 1944. Momsen earned a Navy Cross for his efforts.

Momsen commanded the battleship South Dakota from December 1944 through August 1945. For his distinguished service in command, Momsen was awarded a Gold Star (with Combat "V"), in lieu of a third award of the Legion of Merit.

== Military decorations ==
In addition to the Navy Cross once and the Legion of Merit with two Gold Stars (to show repeat awards) and "V" device, Momsen earned the Navy Distinguished Service Medal, Army Distinguished Service Medal, Navy Commendation Medal with "V" device, World War I Victory Medal with escort clasp, American Defense Service Medal with Fleet Clasp, American Campaign Medal, Asiatic-Pacific Campaign Medal with four service stars, World War II Victory Medal, Navy Occupation Service Medal, National Defense Service Medal, Philippine Liberation Medal with one bronze star and the Submarine Warfare insignia.

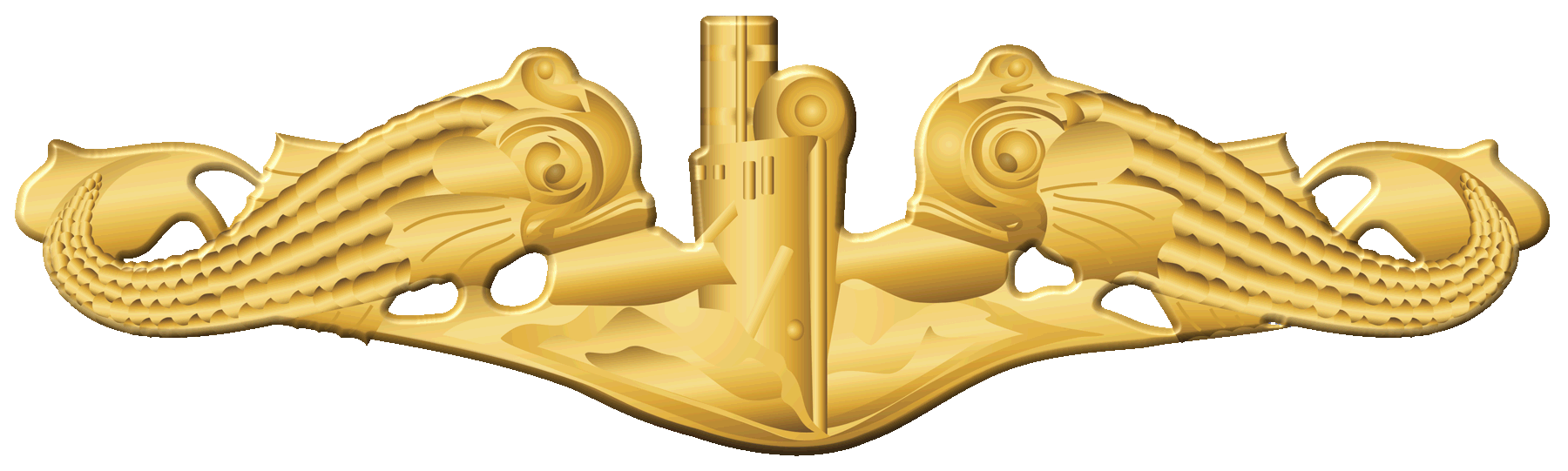

== Later years ==
In November 1945, he directed a fleet of nearly 200 surplus Army and Navy ships, manned by Japanese crews, that evacuated the first of nearly six million Japanese from Manchuria, Formosa, and islands in the Pacific.

Momsen served on the Navy General Board from June 1947 until May 1948. He served as Assistant Chief of Naval Operations for Undersea Warfare from 1948 to 1951, then became Commander of the Submarine Force's Pacific Fleet. Momsen also took part in developing the streamlined Albacore submarine. To avoid Navy interference, Admiral Momsen directed Bureau of Ships to design an unarmed submarine for speed, and told the Navy that the submarine would be a practice target for anti-submarine aircraft from aircraft carriers.

Momsen died of cancer on May 25, 1967. He was buried at Arlington National Cemetery.

== Namesake ==
The 42nd Arleigh Burke-class guided missile destroyer, USS Momsen is named in his honor.

Momsen Hall, the 75-man Bachelor Officer Quarters at the Atlantic Undersea Test and Evaluation Center (AUTEC), Andros Island, Bahamas, was named in his honor in 1969.

On November 10, 2009, the U.S. Navy's newest trainer, the Submarine Escape Trainer, was named in honor of Admiral Momsen in ceremonies at the New London Submarine Base.

== See also ==
- Momsen lung – Rebreather system for escaping sunken submarines
- Steinke hood – Submarine escape breathing apparatus
- Submarine Escape Immersion Equipment – Whole-body exposure suit that allows submariners to escape from a sunken submarine
- USS Albacore SS569, special test submarine – United States research submarine

== Additional references ==
- Keach, James (2000). Submerged (Film). New York: NBC. (Television movie.)
- Barrows, Nat A. (1940). Blow All Ballast: The Story of the Squalus. New York: Dodd, Mead & Company, Inc.
- Momsen.org points to a biographical page on his granddaughter's otherwise unrelated website, Hart Enterprises: Professional Embroidery.
- "Rescue and Salvage of U.S.S. Squalus" by Commander Charles B. Momsen, USN, (Lecture delivered to the Harvard Engineering Society on 6 October 1939)
