= USS Shad =

USS Shad has been the name of more than one United States Navy ship, and may refer to:

- USS Shad (SP-551), a patrol vessel in commission from 1917 to 1919
- USS Shad (SS-235), a submarine in commission from 1942 to 1947

== See also ==
- USS Shada (SP-580), a patrol vessel in commission from 1917 to 1918
