= USS Cero (SS-225) =

Submarine of the United States

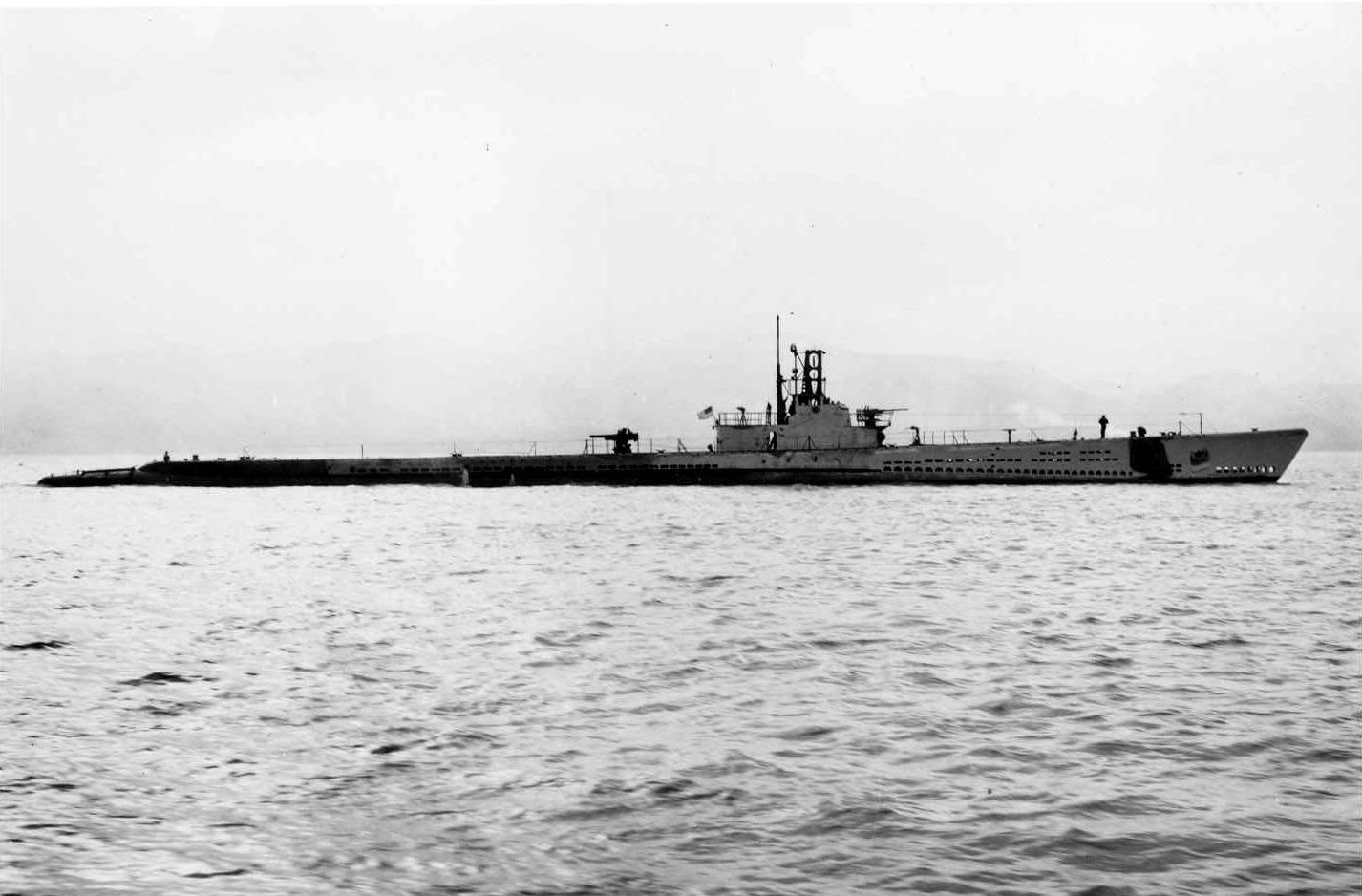
- USS Cero (SS-225), c. 1943–45.

History

United States
- Name: USS Cero
- Namesake: Cero mackerel
- Builder: Electric Boat Company, Groton, Connecticut
- Laid down: 24 August 1942
- Launched: 4 April 1943
- Sponsored by: Mrs. D. E. Barbey
- Commissioned: 4 July 1943
- Decommissioned: 8 June 1946
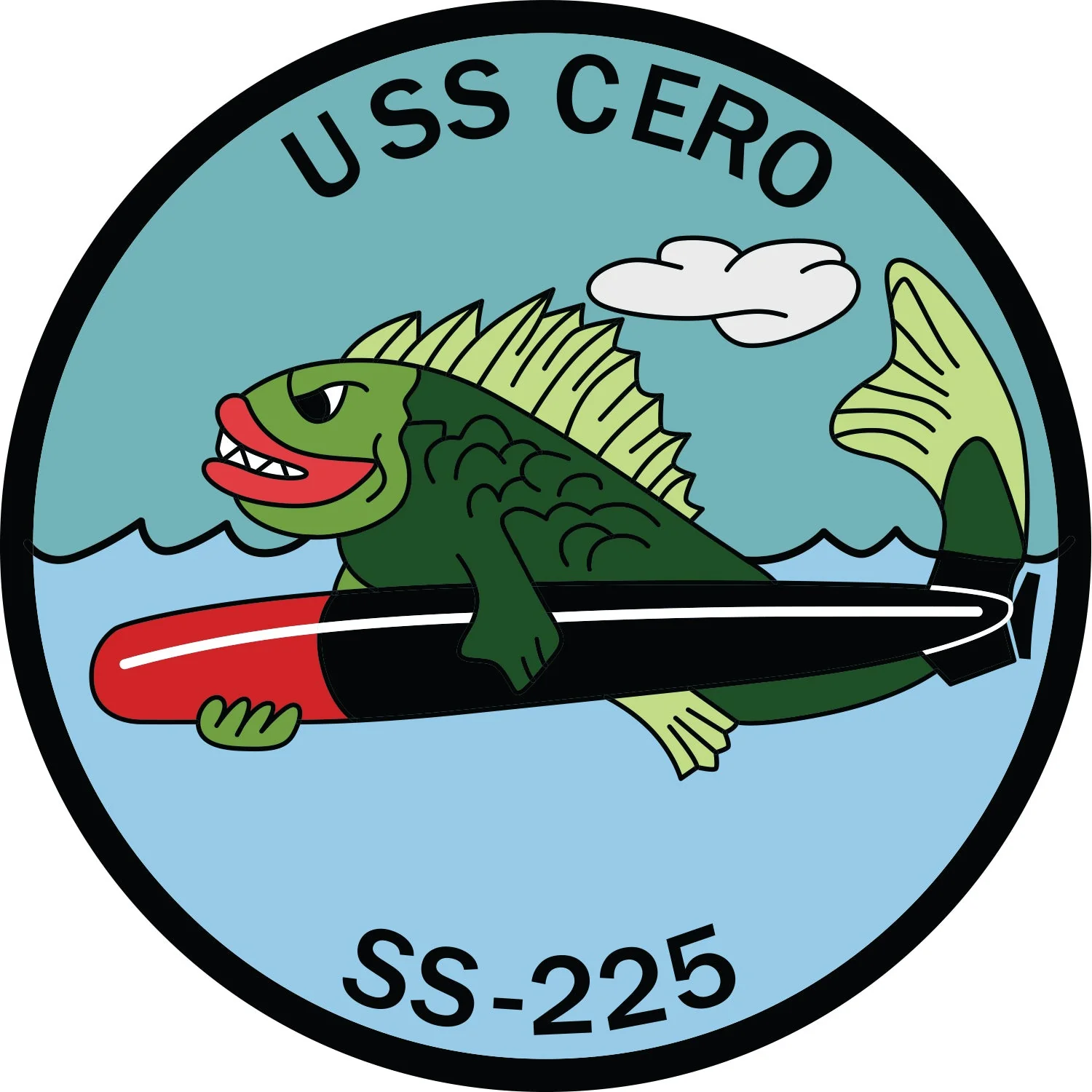
- Badge: USS Cero SS-225
- Commissioned: 4 February 1952
- Decommissioned: 23 December 1953
- Stricken: 30 June 1967
- Fate: Sold for scrap, October 1970

General characteristics
- Class & type: Gato-class diesel-electric submarine
- Displacement: 1,525 long tons (1,549 t) surfaced; 2,424 long tons (2,463 t) submerged
- Length: 311 ft 9 in (95.02 m)
- Beam: 27 ft 3 in (8.31 m)
- Draft: 17 ft (5.2 m) maximum
- Propulsion: 4 × General Motors Model 16-248 V16 Diesel engines driving electric generators; 2 × 126-cell Sargo batteries; 4 × high-speed General Electric electric motors with reduction gears; two propellers; 5,400 shp (4.0 MW) surfaced; 2,740 shp (2.0 MW) submerged
- Speed: 21 knots (39 km/h) surfaced; 9 kn (17 km/h) submerged
- Range: 11,000 nmi (20,000 km) surfaced at 10 kn (19 km/h)
- Endurance: 48 hours at 2 kn (4 km/h) submerged; 75 days on patrol
- Test depth: 300 ft (90 m)
- Complement: 6 officers, 54 enlisted
- Armament: 10 × 21-inch (533 mm) torpedo tubes; 6 forward, 4 aft; 24 torpedoes; 1 × 3-inch (76 mm) / 50 caliber deck gun; Bofors 40 mm and Oerlikon 20 mm cannon

USS Cero (SS-225), a Gato-class submarine, was the first submarine and second ship of the United States Navy to be named for the cero.

== Construction and commissioning ==
Cero's keel was laid down on 24 August 1942 by Electric Boat Company, Groton, Connecticut. She was launched 4 April 1943, sponsored by Mrs. Katherine J. Barbey — the wife of Rear Admiral Daniel E. Barbey, Commanding officer of the Amphibious Force, Southwest Pacific Force at the time — and commissioned 4 July 1943.

== First War Patrol ==
Cero cleared New London 17 August 1943 for Pacific waters, and on 26 September sailed from Pearl Harbor, bound for the East China and Yellow Seas on her first war patrol. This patrol was also the first American wolfpack, comprising Cero, Shad (SS-235), and Grayback (SS-208), commanded from Cero by Captain "Swede" Momsen. At dawn on 12 October, Cero made her first attack, on a convoy of three freighters escorted by two destroyers; one of the merchantmen was heavily damaged. During this patrol, she damaged two other freighters, and a small patrol boat which she engaged on the surface.

== Second, Third, and Fourth War Patrols ==
After refitting at Midway from 16 November to 13 December 1943, Cero, Edward Dissette commanding, made an unproductive second war patrol along the Truk-New Ireland route, then put into Milne Bay, New Guinea, from 12 January to 4 February 1944. Returning to the Truk-New Ireland shipping lanes, she attacked a freighter (later sunk by one of her sister submarines) and inflicted damage on another merchantman. She put into Brisbane, Australia, 2 March, and sailed 3 April on her fourth war patrol, off the Palau Islands. On 11 April 1944, a United States Army Air Forces B-24 Liberator bomber mistakenly strafed and bombed Cero as she submerged in the western Pacific Ocean about 300 nautical miles (560 km; 350 mi) east-northeast of Biak Island. Cero suffered no damage or casualties. Her most successful day to date came on 23 May 1944, when she attacked two freighters and a tanker, sinking one cargo ship, and damaging the tanker.

== Fifth and Sixth War Patrols ==
Cero was refitted at Seeadler Harbor, Manus, from 2 to 26 June 1944, then put to sea for the dangerous waters off Mindanao, where on 5 August, she sent another tanker to the bottom; fifteen days later she finished her fifth patrol at Brisbane.

On 19 September 1944, Cero cleared Darwin, Australia, for the Mindanao and Sulu Seas for her sixth patrol. She called en route at Mios Woendi, where she took on board 17 short tons (15 t) of supplies for Philippine guerrillas, along with 16 soldiers headed for behind-the-lines operations in Luzon. Although not permitted by her orders to attack escorted merchantmen while on this mission, Cero encountered two small craft on 27 October, and in a resulting gun action, damaged both and forced them ashore. On 3 November, north of Manila, she made contact with the guerrillas, landed the soldiers and supplies, and took aboard four evacuees. Later attacked by a Japanese submarine, an alert bridge crew, led by Jim "Red Dog" Vermillion, enabled Cero to evade a torpedo aimed at her. Mission completed, she returned to Pearl Harbor 24 November, then sailed to the West Coast for overhaul.

== Seventh War Patrol ==
Cero, now commanded by Raymond Berthrong, shoved off for action from Pearl Harbor once more 31 March 1945, on her seventh and most productive war patrol. Cruising off Honshū and Hokkaidō, she not only provided lifeguard services for air strikes on Japan, but sank two picket boats and damaged a third, as well as sending three freighters and a large trawler to the bottom.

== Eighth War Patrol ==
Refitted at Guam and Saipan between 27 May and 27 June 1945, Cero, commanded by Raymond Berthrong, had lifeguard and picket duty off Honshū for her eighth war patrol. On 15 July, she rescued three survivors of a downed bomber, and later that day bombarded the Japanese lighthouse and radio station at Shiriya Saki, Honshū. On 18 July, while sailing for the Kurile Islands, Cero came under enemy air attack; a bomb that landed close aboard caused damage so extensive that the sub was forced to cut short her patrol and head for Pearl Harbor, where she arrived 30 July.

== Post-World War II ==
Cero made prolonged visits to New Orleans and Baton Rouge before arriving 5 November 1945 at New London, where she was decommissioned and placed in reserve 8 June 1946. She was recommissioned 4 February 1952, and on 22 March, Cero arrived at her new home port of Key West, Florida. For the next year she cruised in the Caribbean Sea and aided in the work of the Fleet Sonar School, then sailed north for inactivation. She was again decommissioned and placed in reserve at New London 23 December 1953.

Cero also served as a reserve pierside training vessel at the Detroit Naval Armory across from Belle Isle from 1960 to 1967, replacing USS Tambor (SS-198). Cero was in turn replaced by USS Piper (SS-409)

Cero was sold for scrap in 1970.

== Honors and awards ==
- Asiatic-Pacific Campaign Medal with seven battle stars for World War II service

Of Cero′s eight war patrols, all but the second were designated as "successful." She is credited with having sunk a total of 18,159 tons of shipping.
