= Wolfpack (naval tactic) =

World War II naval tactic

The Wolfpack (Rudeltaktik) was a convoy attack tactic employed in the Second World War. It was used principally by the U-boats of the Kriegsmarine during the Battle of the Atlantic, and by the submarines of the United States Navy in the Pacific War. The idea of a co-ordinated submarine attack on convoys had been proposed during the First World War but had had no success. In the Atlantic during the Second World War, the Germans had considerable successes with their wolfpack attacks but were ultimately defeated by the Allies of World War II. In the Pacific, the American submarine force was able to devastate the Japanese merchant marine, though this was not solely due to the wolfpack tactic. Wolfpacks fell out of use during the Cold War as the role of the submarine changed.

== World War I ==
During the Handelskrieg (German war on trade) Allied ships travelled independently prior to the introduction of the convoy system and were vulnerable to attacks by U-boats operating as 'lone wolves'. By gathering up merchant ships into convoys the British Admiralty denied them targets and presented a more defensible front if found and attacked. The logical remedy for the U-boat Arm was to gather U-boats similarly into attacking formations.

In early 1917 Hermann Bauer, the Commander of the High Seas U-boats (Führer der Unterseeboote [FdU]) proposed establishing patrol lines of U-boats across convoy routes, in order to mass for attack on any convoy reported. These boats would be supported by a forward base on land and a headquarters and supply vessel, such as the Deutschland-class converted U-cruisers equipped with radio and supplies of fuel and torpedoes. The shore station would monitor radio transmissions and the commander in the HQ boat would co-ordinate the attack.

This proved easier to propose than to carry out and proved disastrous when tried. In May 1918 six U-boats under the command of KL Rucker, in U-103, were operating in the English Channel; U-103 made contact with a troop convoy but was rammed and sunk by the troopship Olympic before she could attack. U-70 found convoy HS 38 but managed only one torpedo attack, which missed. UB 72 was caught on the surface by British submarine D4, torpedoed and sunk. During the period of operation, 19 homeward and 11 outward convoys passed through the patrol area without loss and two U-boats (a third of the force) had been destroyed.

In October 1918 another attempt at a co-ordinated attack was made in the Mediterranean, when two U-boats attempted a co-ordinated attack on a convoy. One of them was sunk and its commander, ObLt Karl Dönitz, was taken prisoner.

== Inter war years ==
During the interwar years the German Navy was forbidden to have U-boats but began to re-arm in 1935. Under Karl Dönitz as FdU developed co-ordinated attack tactics based on Bauer's plan and his own experience and trials of the new tactics in 1936 proved successful. Dönitz called his strategy of submarine warfare Rudeltaktik, which literally translates as "pack tactic" but referred specifically to the hunting tactics of wolves and submarines were known by their nickname of graue Wölfe (grey wolves).

== U-boats in the Second World War ==
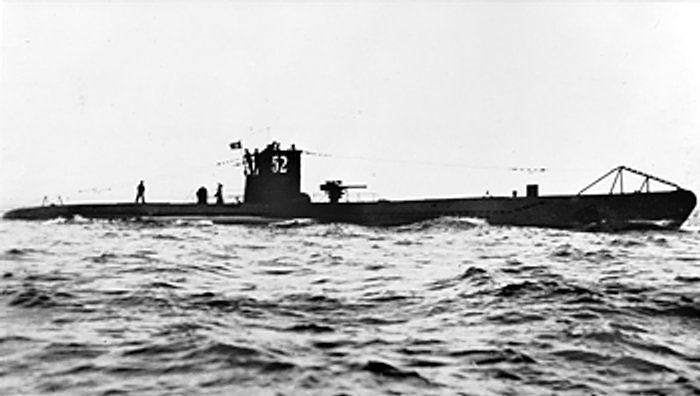
German submarine U-52

With the outbreak of the Second World War the U-boat Arm found the success of the pre-war trials had created some complacency; when these tactics were first tried in October 1939 (Hartmann's wolfpack) they were a failure; Hartmann found he was unable to exercise any tactical control from his boat at sea and the convoy attack was unsuccessful, while three U-boats were lost in the operation. A second attempt the following month also failed. A further attempt in June 1940 following the Norwegian campaign (Rösing's wolfpack) also failed, leading to a re-think of German tactics.

=== Rudeltaktik ===
The revised approach saw Dönitz micromanaging operations at sea from his headquarters in occupied France, relying on the supposedly unbreakable Enigma code to transmit and receive orders and co-ordinate movements. U-boat movements were controlled by U-boat Command (BdU) from Kerneval. U-boats usually patrolled separately, often strung out in lines across likely convoy routes to engage merchant ships and small vulnerable destroyers, being ordered to congregate only after one located a convoy and alerted the BdU. Rudeltaktik (pack tactics) consisted of as many U-boats as could reach the scene of the attack. With the exception of the orders given by the BdU, U-boat commanders could attack as they saw fit. Often they were given a probable number of U-boats that would arrive and when they were in contact with the convoy, make call signs to see how many had arrived. If their number were sufficiently high compared to the expected threat of the escorts, they would attack. This led to a series of successful pack attacks on Allied convoys in the latter half of 1940 (known as "the Happy Time" to the U-boat men).

=== Drawbacks ===
While the German pack tactic was effective, it had several drawbacks. Most notably, wolfpacks required extensive radio communication to coordinate the attacks. This left the U-boats vulnerable to a device called the High Frequency Direction Finder (HF/DF or Huff-Duff), which allowed Allied naval forces to determine the location of the enemy boats transmitting and attack them.

The pack tactic was able to bring about a force concentration against a convoy but no tactics for co-ordinated attack were developed; each commander present was left to move against the convoy as he saw fit. The escort groups developed group tactics against U-boat attack, gaining an advantage. As packs got larger the risks from this lack of co-ordination increased, such as overlapping attacks, collision or friendly fire incidents (in May 1943 for example, two U-boats stalking a Gibraltar convoy, U-439 and U-659 collided, with the loss of both).

Away from the Atlantic, the U-boat Arm had less scope for pack attacks; Operation Drumbeat against US shipping in early 1942, off the US eastern coast, and Operation Neuland in the Caribbean, were conducted by U-boats on individual patrol, until the introduction of a convoy system there saw the U-boats withdraw to easier hunting grounds. In the South Atlantic and the Indian Ocean individual routing by the Allies and small numbers of U-boats active there again saw the employment of the lone wolf approach by the U-boat Arm.

=== Countermeasures ===
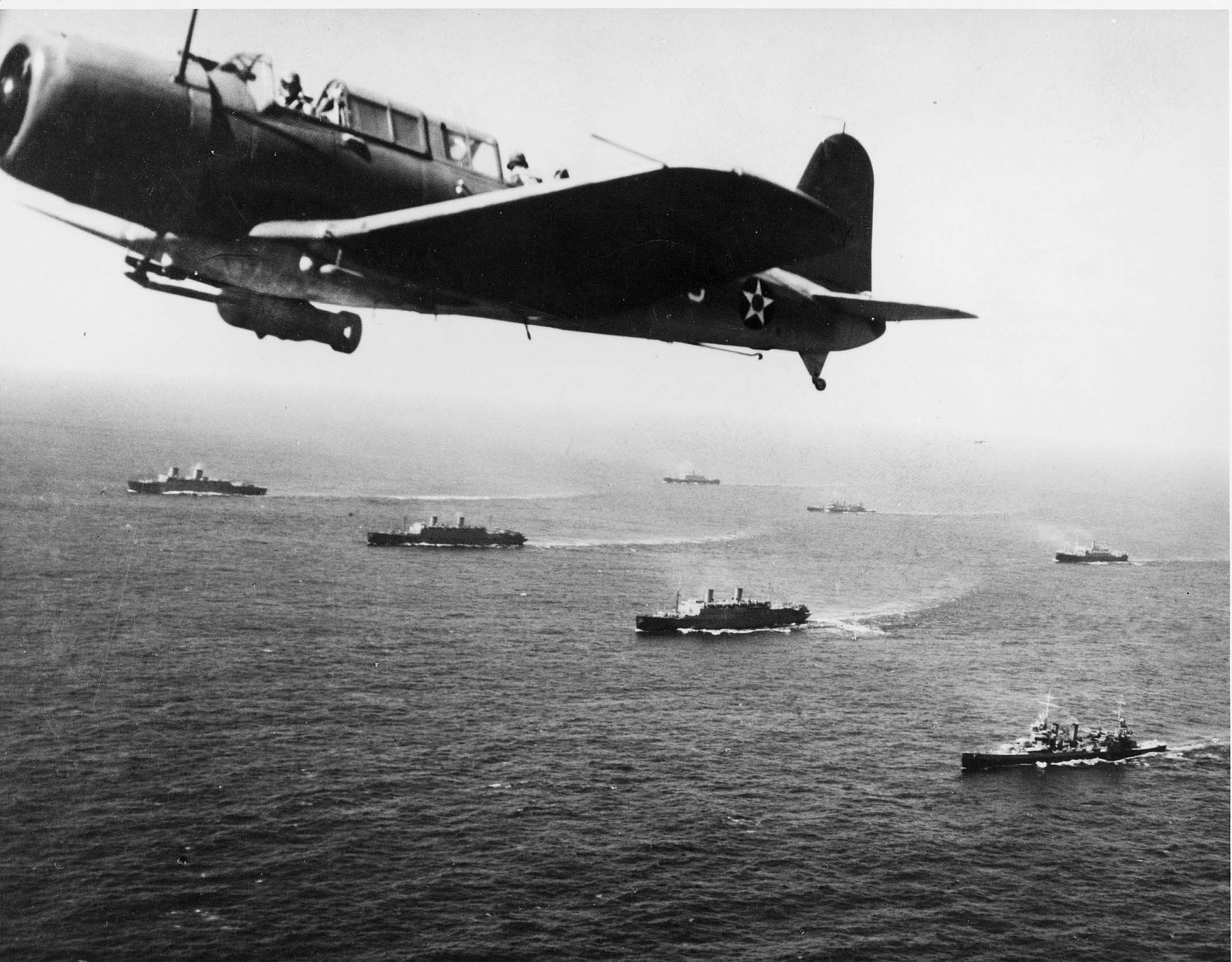
Convoy escorts and anti-submarine aircraft, November 1941

Although the wolfpacks proved a serious threat to Allied shipping, the Allies developed counter-measures. The expansion of the escort force, and the development of well-trained and well-organized escort groups, led to more and more successes as the campaign went on. Time and again escort groups were able to fight off numerically superior packs and destroy attackers, until the rate of exchange became ruinous. Effective air cover from long-range aircraft with radar, and escort carriers and blimps, allowed U-boats to be spotted as they shadowed a convoy (waiting for the cover of night to attack).

=== Naming ===
Some sources refer to different wolfpacks by name or provide lists of named wolfpacks, though this can be a misnomer. Dönitz’s pack tactic envisaged a patrol line of six to ten boats (later, twenty to thirty or more) across a convoy route to search for targets. If a convoy was found the boats would form a pack, to mount a simultaneous attack. At the outbreak of the Second World War Germany had had 27 sea- and ocean-going U-boats, enough to mount a single patrol line in the Atlantic. Patrol lines were not named and if a pack was formed it was referred to by the name of the skipper who had found the target. This situation improved with the fall of France and the occupation of the French Atlantic ports but U-boat construction had barely kept pace with losses and it was not until the summer of 1941 that several patrol groups were possible, creating the need to differentiate them. At first this was by location (West, Centre, South, Greenland) but in August BdU began to assign codenames, chosen for their historical or cultural value. This continued until the end of the campaign, though after the spring of 1944 the UbW had moved away from pack attacks to its inshore campaign of individual patrols operating in British coastal waters. The last named U-boat group was Seewolf, a seven boat operation against the North American coast, countered by the USN with Operation Teardrop.

The codename applied to the group or to the patrol line that they formed. Not all groups so named were involved in pack tactics; the Goeben group was formed to enter the Mediterranean and support operations there; Eisbär group were dispatched to the waters off South Africa, where they operated independently. Of those groups forming patrol lines not all found convoys or were able to form packs if they did. Where a named group formed and mounted a pack attack on a convoy, referring to it by name as a wolfpack is appropriate.

== American submarines in World War II ==
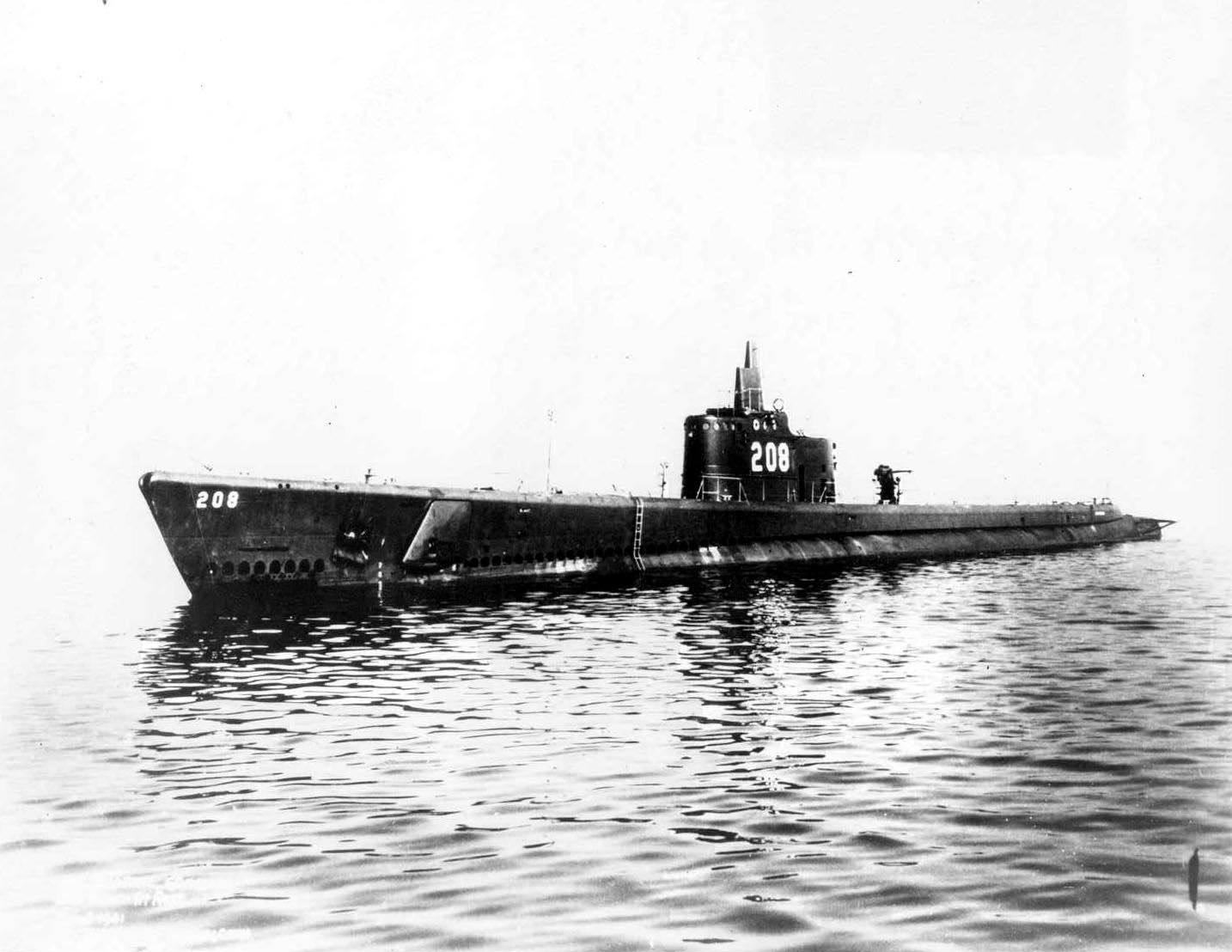
USS Grayback

In the Pacific the United States Navy (USN) used individual patrol and pack tactics; the South West Pacific command (SoWePac) under Rear-Admiral Ralph Christie, based at Brisbane and Fremantle favoured the individual patrol, while the Central Pacific command, under Rear Admiral Charles Lockwood at Pearl Harbor (SubPac) used the pack tactic.

=== Tactics ===
American wolfpacks, called coordinated attack groups, usually comprised three boats that patrolled in close company and organized before they left port under the command of the senior captain of the three. "Swede" Momsen devised the tactics and led the first American wolfpack – composed of Cero, Shad and Grayback – from Midway on 1 October 1943. In this way the USN was able to make command at sea work; by forming stable groups of three submarines, these groups were able to develop group tactics for attack on Japanese convoys.

=== Naming ===
Part of this development, and to promote an esprit de corps, was naming the groups as they formed. These names were based on that of the group commander; the group comprising Growler (Cdr. "Ben" Oakley), Sealion and Pampanito were known as "Ben's Busters"; the group Shark, Seadragon, and Blackfish were "Blakely's Behemoths".

== Cold War and beyond ==
Wolfpacks fell out of use during the Cold War as the role of the submarine changed. With trade returned to peacetime conditions and the end of convoying, the submarine ceased to be a commerce raider and moved to a range of more traditional military roles, such as scouting, intelligence-gathering, clandestine transport and in the event of a full-scale war, fleet operations.

The USN deploys its attack submarines on individual patrols, with the exception of one or (rarely) two attack submarines in each carrier strike group. While American ballistic missile submarines have always operated alone, Soviet ballistic missile submarines operated in well-protected bastions. To date the world's navies continue to deploy their submarines on individual patrols.

== See also ==
- List of wolfpacks of World War II
- Convoy SC 7 for an account of one of the first Allied convoys to suffer a wolfpack attack

== Sources ==
- Blair, Clay (1996). Hitler's U-Boat War: The Hunters 1939-1942. Cassell. ISBN 0-304-35260-8.
- Samuel Eliot Morison (1958) History of United States Naval Operations in World War II vol XII "Leyte, June 1944 – January 1945" ISBN (none)
- VE Tarrant (1989) The U-Boat Offensive 1914–1945 ISBN 0-85368-928-8
- Peter Maas, The Terrible Hours: The Man Behind the Greatest Submarine Rescue in History (HarperCollins New York, 1999)
- E. B. Potter and Chester W. Nimitz, eds; Sea Power: A Naval History (Englewood Cliffs, N.J.: Prentice-Hall, 1960)
- Morison, Samuel Eliot, History of United States Naval Operations in World War II: Leyte, June 1944 – January 1945
