= USS Grayback (SS-208) =

World War II US Navy submarine

Coordinates: 25°47′N 128°45′E

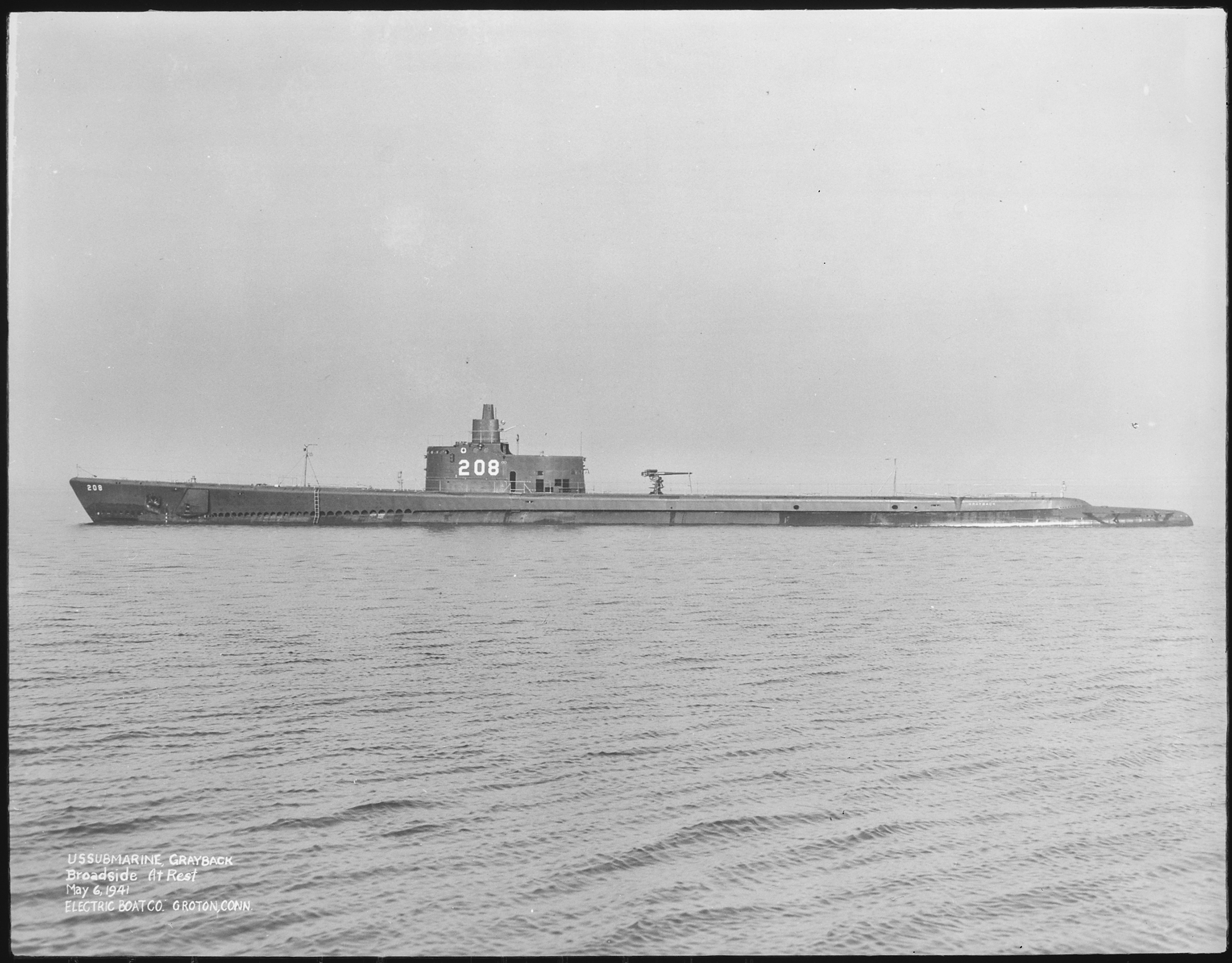
- Grayback in 1941

History

United States
- Builder: Electric Boat Company
- Laid down: 3 April 1940
- Launched: 31 January 1941
- Commissioned: 30 June 1941
- Fate: Sunk by aircraft operating from the Japanese aircraft carrier Zuikaku south of Okinawa, 27 February 1944

General characteristics
- Class & type: Tambor class diesel-electric submarine
- Displacement: 1,475 long tons (1,499 t) standard, surfaced; 2,370 long tons (2,410 t) submerged
- Length: 307 ft 2 in (93.62 m)
- Beam: 27 ft 3 in (8.31 m)
- Draft: 14 ft 7 1/2 in (4.458 m)
- Propulsion: 4 × General Motors Model 16-248 V16 Diesel engines driving electric generators; 2 × 126-cell Sargo batteries; 4 × high-speed General Electric electric motors with reduction gears; two propellers; 5,400 shp (4.0 MW) surfaced; 2,740 shp (2.0 MW) submerged
- Speed: 20.4 knots (38 km/h) surfaced; 8.75 knots (16 km/h) submerged
- Range: 11,000 nautical miles (20,000 km) at 10 knots (19 km/h)
- Endurance: 48 hours at 2 knots (3.7 km/h) submerged
- Test depth: 250 ft (76 m)
- Complement: 6 officers, 54 enlisted
- Armament: 10 × 21-inch (533 mm) torpedo tubes; 6 forward, 4 aft; 24 torpedoes; 1 × 3-inch (76 mm) / 50 caliber deck gun; Bofors 40 mm and Oerlikon 20 mm cannon

USS Grayback (SS-208), was a Tambor-class submarine, and was the first ship of the United States Navy to be named for the lake herring Coregonus artedi. She ranked 20 among all U.S. submarines in total tonnage sunk during World War II, with 63,835 tons, and 24th in number of ships sunk, with 14. She was sunk near Okinawa on 27 February 1944. Her wreck was discovered in June 2019.

== Construction and commissioning ==
Grayback′s keel was laid down by the Electric Boat Company in Groton, Connecticut. She was launched on 31 January 1940, sponsored by Mrs. Lydia Ballou Brown (née Chappell), wife of Rear Admiral Wilson Brown, Superintendent of the United States Naval Academy, and commissioned on 30 June 1941 with Lieutenant Willard A. Saunders in command.

== Operational history ==
Attached to the United States Atlantic Fleet, Grayback conducted her shakedown cruise in Long Island Sound from Newport, New London, and New York City. In company with the submarine Grampus (SS-207), she departed New London, Connecticut, on 8 September 1941 for patrol duty in the Caribbean Sea and Chesapeake Bay, then arrived at Portsmouth Naval Shipyard in Kittery, Maine, on 30 November 1941 for overhaul. After the United States's entry into World War II, Grayback departed for Pearl Harbor, Hawaii arriving 8 February 1942.

=== First war patrol ===
Grayback's first war patrol from 15 February to 10 April 1942 took her along the coast of Saipan and Guam. There, she had a four-day encounter with an enemy submarine; the enemy submarine fired two torpedoes at Grayback on the morning of 22 February, then continued to trail her across the Pacific. Grayback spotted the enemy conning tower a few times, and the Japanese ship broached once; but the Grayback could not get into position to attack. After four days, Grayback shook off the other submarine and continued on patrol. On 17 March, she sank her first ship, the 3291-ton cargo ship Ishikari Maru off Port Lloyd, Chichijima, Bonin Islands.

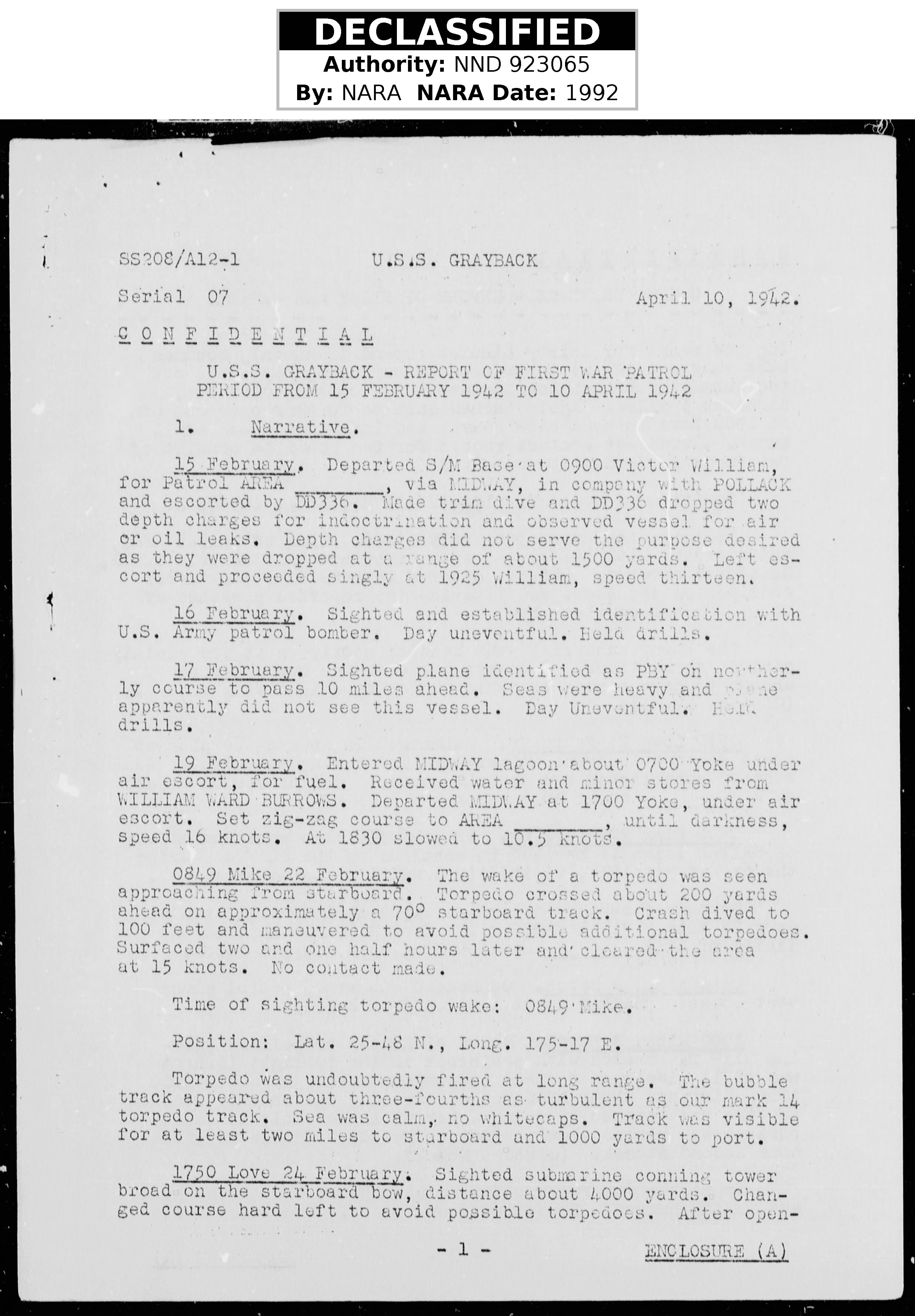
This is the fourth page of Grayback War Diary related to first war patrol.

=== Second through fourth war patrols ===
Grayback'failed to find targets on her second war patrol despite taking the risk of surfacing during the day. On 22 June, she arrived at Fremantle, Western Australia, which was to be her home base for most of the war. On her third and fourth war patrols, in the South China Sea and St. George's Passage, Grayback was hampered by bright moonlight, shallow and treacherous water, and enemy patrol craft. She managed to damage several freighters and an enemy submarine. The presence of Grayback and her sister ships in these waters tied up enemy escorts and helped America's first offensive campaign in the Pacific war, the Guadalcanal campaign.

=== Fifth war patrol ===
Her fifth war patrol began on 7 December 1942. A week out of port, Pharmacist's Mate Harry B. Roby performed an emergency appendectomy, the second to be done on an American patrolling submarine. With Grayback running 100 feet (30m) beneath the surface, and despite lacking a surgeon's tool kit, the untutored Roby successfully removed the infected appendix, and his patient was back standing watch by the end of the patrol. On 25 December, Grayback surfaced to sink four landing barges with her deck guns. Four days later, she was fired at by an enemy submarine, but maneuvered to avoid the torpedoes. On 3 January 1943, Grayback sank I-18, one of 25 Japanese submarines destroyed by western submarines during the war.

On 5 January, Grayback served as beacon ship for the bombardment of Munda Bay in the Solomon Islands, and also engaged in rescue work. Lying off Munda early on the morning of 5 January, she received word that six survivors of a crashed Martin B-26 Marauder bomber from the 70th Bombardment Squadron were holed up on the island. Grayback sent ashore two men (Lt. J.A. Davis and CGM Barton Brooks), then submerged at dawn to avoid enemy aircraft. The submariners located the downed aviators, three of whom were injured, and hid out with them in the jungle. As night fell, Grayback surfaced offshore and by coded light signals directed the small boat "home safe" with the rescued aviators. For this action, skipper Edward C. Stephan received the Navy Cross, as well as a Silver Star from the United States Army.

Grayback continued on patrol, torpedoing and damaging several Japanese ships. On 17 January, she attacked a destroyer escorting a large maru, hoping to disable the escort and then sink the freighter with her deck guns. However, the destroyer evaded the torpedoes and dropped 19 depth charges on Grayback. One blew a gasket on a manhole cover, and the submarine, leaking seriously, was ordered back to Brisbane, Australia, where she arrived 23 January.

=== Sixth war patrol ===
On her sixth war patrol from 16 February to 4 April 1943, Grayback again had a run of bad luck, operating in the Bismarck Archipelago–Solomon Islands area without any military success. Her newly installed SJ radar had failed to function, and although she had taken several shots at maru merchant ships, none sank.

=== Seventh war patrol ===
The seventh patrol was more successful. Departing Brisbane on 25 April, Grayback intercepted a convoy whose position had been radioed to her by Albacore (SS-218) on 11 May. In a night surface attack, Grayback fired a spread of six torpedoes at the seven freighters and their three escorts. The three escorts charged, and she had to go deep to elude the attacking enemy. She was credited with the sinking of cargo ship Yodogawa Maru. On 16 May, she torpedoed and seriously damaged a destroyer. The following day, Grayback intercepted four marus with one escort; she sank the freighter England Maru and damaged two others before she was forced to dive. Grayback arrived at Pearl Harbor on 30 May, then proceeded to San Francisco, California, for a much needed overhaul and modernization.

=== Eighth war patrol ===
Arriving at Pearl Harbor on 12 September 1943, Grayback prepared for her eighth war patrol, now under the command of John Anderson Moore. Sailing 26 September with Shad (SS-235), she met Cero (SS-225) at Midway Island to form the first of the Submarine Force's highly successful wolfpacks. The three submarines under Captain Charles B. "Swede" Momsen in Cero cruised the China Sea and returned to base with claims of 38,000 tons sunk and 3,300 damaged. Grayback accounted for two ships, a passenger-cargo vessel torpedoed 14 October and a freighter, a former Armed merchantman, Awata Maru, torpedoed after an end-around run on a fast convoy 22 October. Wolfpack tactics came into play on 2 October as Grayback closed on a convoy already attacked by Shad, and sank a 9,000-ton transport, listing from two of Shad's torpedoes. The submarines had now expended all torpedoes, and on 10 November, they returned to Midway.

Grayback commanding officer (CO) John Anderson Moore was awarded the Navy Cross after this patrol.

=== Ninth war patrol ===
With almost a quarter of her crew untested in battle Grayback departed Pearl Harbor for the East China Sea on 2 December for her ninth war patrol. Within five days of her first contact with Japanese ships, she had expended all her torpedoes in a series of attacks that netted four ships for over 10,000 tons. The action began on the night of 18 to 19 December; Grayback attacked a convoy of four freighters and three escorts. She sent freighter Gyokurei Maru and escort Numakaze to the bottom and damaged several others in a surface attack. Two nights later, 20 to 21 December, she spotted another convoy of six ships, and after an end-around run, she fired a spread of nine torpedoes into the heart of the Japanese formation. This first attack sank one freighter and damaged another before Grayback dived to elude depth charges. Three hours later, she surfaced and sank a second freighter. After an unsuccessful attack the following night had exhausted her torpedo supply, Grayback headed home. The submarine surfaced on 27 December to sink a good-sized fishing boat with deck guns before reaching Pearl Harbor on 4 January 1944.

CO John Anderson Moore was awarded a second Navy Cross after this mission.

=== Tenth war patrol and sinking ===
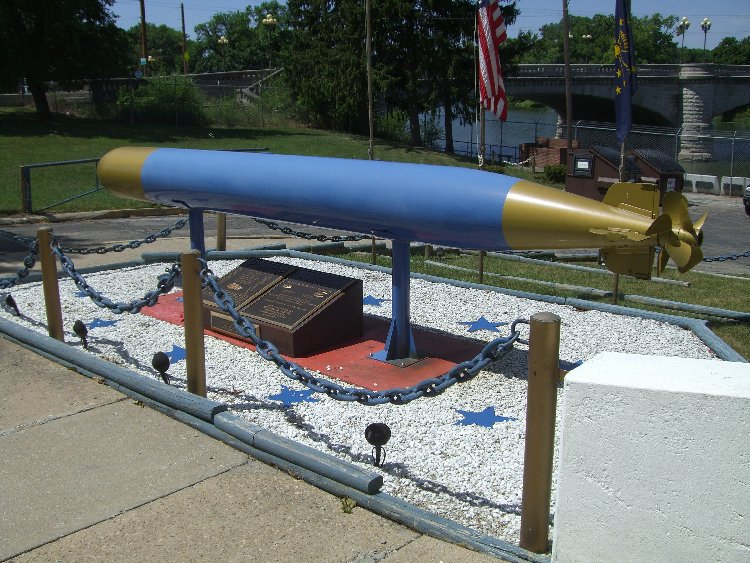
The USS Grayback (SS-208) memorial on the grounds of the Heslar Naval Armory.

Grayback's tenth patrol, her most successful in terms of tonnage sunk, was also her last. She sailed from Pearl Harbor on 28 January 1944 for the East China Sea. On 24 February, Grayback radioed that she had sunk two cargo ships on 19 February and had damaged two others (Taikei Maru and Toshin Maru sunk). On 25 February, she transmitted her second and final report. That morning, she had sunk tanker Nanho Maru and severely damaged Asama Maru. With only two torpedoes remaining, she was ordered home from patrol. Due to reach Midway on 7 March, Grayback did not arrive. On 30 March, ComSubPac listed her as missing and presumed lost with all hands.

From captured Japanese records, the submarine's last few days were pieced together after World War II. Heading home through the East China Sea after attacking convoy Hi-40 on 24 February, Grayback used her last two torpedoes to sink the freighter Ceylon Maru on 27 February. Later that same day, a Japanese aircraft carrier-based Nakajima B5N (Allied reporting name "Kate") torpedo bomber, probably launched from the aircraft carrier Zuikaku spotted Grayback on the surface in the East China Sea and attacked, hitting her with a 250-kilogram (551 lb) aerial bomb. According to Japanese reports, the submarine "exploded and sank immediately," but antisubmarine craft were called in to depth-charge the area, clearly marked by a trail of air bubbles, until at last a heavy oil slick swelled to the surface.

Grayback′s commanding officer John Anderson Moore was awarded his third Navy Cross posthumously after this patrol.

== Honors and awards ==
Grayback and her crew received two Navy Unit Commendations for their seventh, eighth, ninth, and tenth war patrols.

Grayback received eight battle stars for her World War II service.

== Wreck discovery ==
On 10 November 2019, a private research group, Lost 52 Project, announced it had found the wreck of Grayback 50 nautical miles (93 km; 58 mi) south of Okinawa, in June 2019. The wreck was discovered about 100 nautical miles (190 km; 120 mi) from the coordinates established by the U.S. Navy in 1946 because of an error in its translation of the original Imperial Japanese Navy combat action reports. The discovery was officially verified by the U.S. Navy and the families of the deceased crew members were notified. The submarine sits upright on the bottom in 1,400 ft (430 m) of water. The deck gun was found about 400 ft (about 120 m) from the primary wreckage.

The wreck has severe damage aft of the conning tower, consistent with Japanese reports of a direct bomb hit in that area. The bow is broken off at an angle, and a portion of the hull near the stern imploded. The builder's plate remains attached to the intact bridge.

== See also ==
- List of United States Navy losses in World War II
