= Chinese cruiser Ping Hai =

Chinese light cruiser

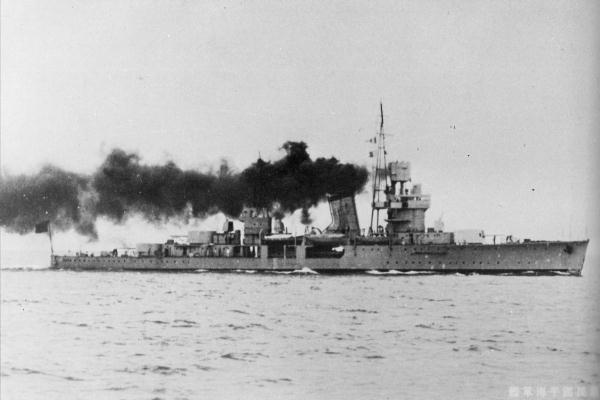
- Ping Hai in 1936

History

Republic of China
- Name: Ping Hai
- Builder: Kiangnan Dock and Engineering Works, Shanghai, China
- Laid down: 28 June 1931
- Launched: 28 September 1935
- Completed: 18 June 1936
- Fate: Sunk 23 September 1937 by Japanese aircraft; subsequently salvaged by the Japanese to become Yasoshima

Empire of Japan
- Name: Yasoshima
- Acquired: 1938
- Recommissioned: 25 September 1944
- Reclassified: kaibokan, 1 June 1944
- Fate: Sunk 25 November 1944 by US Navy aircraft

General characteristics
- Class & type: Ning Hai-class cruiser
- Displacement: 2,448 t (2,409 long tons)
- Length: 360 ft (110 m)
- Beam: 39 ft (12 m)
- Draught: 13 ft (4.0 m)
- Propulsion: Two-shaft Reciprocating Engines; 1 oil-fired and 4 coal-fired boilers; 7,488 hp (5,584 kW)
- Speed: 21 knots (24 mph; 39 km/h)
- Range: 5,000 nmi (9,300 km) at 12 kn (14 mph; 22 km/h)
- Complement: 361
- Armament: 6 × 140 mm (5.5 in)/50 guns; 3 × 76 mm (3 in) AA guns; 4 × 57 mm (2 in) AA guns; 4 × machine guns; 4 × 533 mm (21 in) torpedo tubes; 9 × depth charges
- Armour: Belt: 25 to 76 mm (0.98 to 2.99 in); Armour deck: 19 to 25 mm (0.75 to 0.98 in); Turrets: 25 mm (0.98 in); Conning tower: 25 mm (0.98 in)

Ping Hai (Chinese: 平海; lit. 'Peaceful Seas') was a light cruiser in the Chinese fleet before World War II and the second ship of the Ning Hai class. The ship was laid down in China to the specifications supplied by the Japanese, and Japanese advisors were hired to oversee the construction. Compared to its sister ship Ning Hai, it had a lower-output powerplant and lacked seaplane facilities. Its anti-aircraft armament was also different from that of its sister.

The progress of its construction was affected by the Mukden Incident (18 September 1931) and the January 28 Incident (28 January – 3 March 1932). Disruption of parts supply and non-cooperation of Japanese advisors delayed its launch date from the originally planned 10 October 1933 to 28 September 1935. Blocked delivery of originally-specified anti-aircraft weapons meant that equivalent replacements of those weapons had to be bought via Germany. When it was completed in 1936, official outbreak of war was barely a year away.

== Service record ==
Ping Hai served as the flagship of the Republic of China Navy (ROCN) since April 1937.

As one of the most powerful surface combatants within the ROCN, Ping Hai was subjected to aerial attacks by the Imperial Japanese Navy since the Battle of Shanghai, but she was not until 23 September, during the Japanese assault on the Kiangyin Fortress (which guarded the segment of Yangtze River near Nanking), for Ping Hai to finally succumb with her sister ship to airstrikes launched from both the aircraft carrier Kaga and airfields around occupied Shanghai.

She was then re-floated by the Japanese in 1938 as sunken ships would not be as badly corroded by river water as they would be by sea water. Originally the ship was to be transferred to the Collaborationist navy under Wang Jing-Wei, but the Japanese elected to seize her instead and had Ping Hai towed to Sasebo, outfitted first as a barracks hulk Mishima (見島) and ultimately as the escort ship Yasoshima on 10 June 1944. She was re-rated first as a coastal defense ship and then as an escort vessel. The ship lost all cruiser armaments but received radar sets as well as standard Japanese dual-purpose and anti-aircraft weapons.

Yasoshima was deployed for combat operations on 25 September 1944, participating in the Battle of Leyte Gulf and escorting troop convoys. Aircraft from the carriers USS Ticonderoga and Langley caught her escorting two merchantmen west of Luzon and sank all three on 25 November 1944.

== Bibliography ==
- Lacroix, Eric & Wells II, Linton (1997). Japanese Cruisers of the Pacific War. Annapolis, Maryland: Naval Institute Press. ISBN 0-87021-311-3.
- Tamura, Toshio (1984). "The Chinese Light Cruisers Ning Hai and Ping Hai (1930–1936)". Warship International. XXII (2): 118–131. ISSN 0043-0374.
- Whitley, M.J. (1995). Cruisers of World War Two: An International Encyclopedia. Annapolis, Maryland: Naval Institute Press. ISBN 1-55750-141-6.
