= Chinese cruiser Ning Hai =

Chinese light cruiser

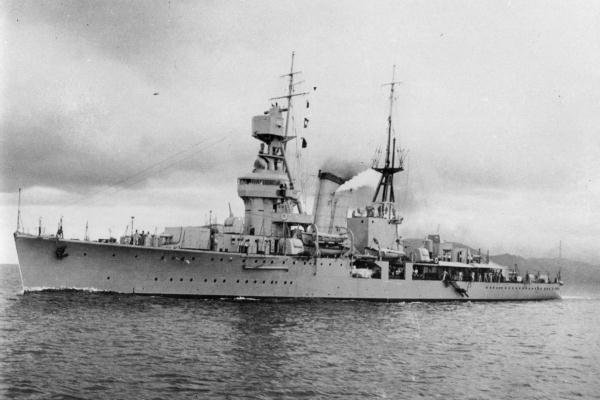
- Chinese cruiser Ning Hai in 1932

History

Republic of China
- Name: Ning Hai
- Ordered: 1930
- Builder: Harima Shipyards, Japan
- Laid down: 20 February 1931
- Launched: 10 October 1931
- Commissioned: 1 September 1932
- Fate: Sunk 23 September 1937

Empire of Japan
- Name: Ioshima
- Acquired: 4 May 1938
- Commissioned: 10 June 1944
- Reclassified: kaibokan, 1 June 1944
- Stricken: 10 November 1944
- Fate: Sunk, 19 September 1944

General characteristics
- Class & type: Ning Hai-class cruiser
- Displacement: 2,526 t (2,486 long tons)
- Length: 360 ft (110 m)
- Beam: 39 ft (12 m)
- Draught: 13 ft (4.0 m)
- Propulsion: Three-shaft Reciprocating Engines; 4 coal/oil-fired boilers; 10,579 hp (7,889 kW)
- Speed: 23.2 knots (26.7 mph; 43.0 km/h)
- Range: 5,000 nmi (9,300 km) at 12 kn (14 mph; 22 km/h)
- Complement: 361
- Armament: 6 × 14 cm/50 3rd Year Type naval guns; 6 × 8 cm/40 3rd Year Type naval guns; 8 × Vickers 2-pounder AA guns; 10 × Vickers machine guns; 4 × 533 mm (21 in) torpedo tubes; 9 × depth charges
- Armour: Belt: 25 to 76 mm (0.98 to 2.99 in); Armour deck: 19 to 25 mm (0.75 to 0.98 in); Turrets: 25 mm (0.98 in); Conning tower: 25 mm (0.98 in)
- Aircraft carried: 2 × floatplanes
- Aviation facilities: Hangar and hoist crane

Ning Hai (Chinese: 甯海; lit. 'Peaceful Seas') was a light cruiser in the Republic of China Navy (ROCN) before World War II and the lead ship of her class. She was sunk in the early days of the Second Sino-Japanese War by aircraft from the Imperial Japanese Navy, and her wreck was raised and repaired by the Japanese, re-entering service with the Japanese Navy in the Pacific War as the escort vessel Ioshima (五百島). She was sunk again in September 1944 by a USN submarine.

== Background ==
By the end of the 1920s, the ROCN had only four antiquated 19th century protected cruisers and two training cruisers received before World War I. The Kuomintang government had an ambitious re-armament plan but lacked funds, and after extensive negotiations with shipbuilders in the United States, United Kingdom, Germany and Japan, placed an order with the Japanese for one light cruiser to be built in Japan, with a second vessel to be built in China with Japanese assistance. Despite the very strained political relations between Japan and China and the strenuous objections of the Japanese military, Harima Shipyards completed the first cruiser in 1932.

== Design ==
Ning Hai was based on the experimental Japanese cruiser Yūbari, which combined a small size with heavy weaponry, but in an even smaller displacement of only 2,526 t (2,486 long tons). As with Yūbari, Ning Hai has a single trunked smokestack, and a tripod bridge arrangement. Her weaponry was comparable to ships with a larger displacement: six 14 cm/50 3rd Year Type naval guns mounted in three double gun turrets, six 8 cm/40 3rd Year Type naval guns, and dual 533 mm torpedo tubes. Ning Hai also had a small hangar for two seaplanes; two Aichi AB-3 biplanes, one bought from Japan and one built locally using a spare engine and domestic materials, were assigned to it. There was no aircraft catapult, and the seaplanes were hoisted onto and deployed using a crane.

However, the vessel was underpowered, with three antiquated vertical four-cylinder triple-expansion steam engines, two of which were coal-fired, yielding a top speed of only 22 knots (41 km/h; 25 mph). The excessive top-weight of the design also created stability problems. Due to these issues, Ning Hai was suitable only for coastal operations against gunboats or smaller vessels.

== Operational history ==
Ning Hai was laid down at Harima Shipyards in Aioi, Hyogo, Japan on 20 February 1931, launched on 10 October 1931 and completed 30 July 1932. She was commissioned on 1 September 1932 as the flagship of the Republic of China Navy (ROCN), serving in that capacity until the commissioning of Ping Hai in April 1937. She returned to Japan in May 1933 for repairs, and again in June 1934 for the funeral of Japanese Fleet Admiral Tōgō Heihachirō. She again underwent repairs before her return to China

As one of the more powerful surface combatants within the small ROCN, following the start of the Second Sino-Japanese War, Ning Hai was a target of the Imperial Japanese Navy since the Battle of Shanghai, but it was not until 23 September, during the Japanese assault on Kiangyin Fortress (which guarded a segment of Yangtze River near Nanking), that Ning Hai came under severe attack by Japanese bombers, sustaining four bomb hits while Ping Hai was hit by eight bombs and sunk. Ning Hai escaped but on 25 September when Yokosuka B3Y1 torpedo bombers scored two direct hits, sinking her in shallow water. These airstrikes were launched from both the aircraft carrier Kaga and airfields around Japanese-occupied Shanghai. The Imperial Japanese Navy captured the wreck on 5 December 1937.

An attempt to re-float Ning Hai by the Japanese in April, 1938 was unsuccessful with two salvage divers killed. An attempt on 4 May 1938 was successful, and the hulk was towed to Shanghai for basic repairs. Originally the Japanese planned for the vessel to be the flagship of the collaborationist navy established by the Nanjing Nationalist Government, but instead opted to have her towed to Sasebo Naval District, where on 11 July the vessel was re-classified as the training vessel and coastal defense ship Mikura (御蔵). However the ship was moored permanently at Sasebo as barracks hulk from July 1938 to December 1943.

In December 1943, with Japanese maritime traffic under increasing pressure from Allied submarine warfare, Mikura was towed to the Harima Shipyards for reconstruction into a "Kaibōkan" (escort ship). Reconstruction was completed on 1 June 1944 and she was recommissioned into the Imperial Japanese Navy as Ioshima (五百島) on 10 June and assigned to the Yokosuka Naval District. After training in the Seto Inland Sea, she escorted a convoy of transports to Iwo Jima from 22–31 July, escaping a torpedo attack by an unknown submarine on 26 July. On 10 September, Ioshima departed Yokosuka on a second escort mission, but was hit by three torpedoes fired by the United States Navy submarine USS Shad on 19 September 1944 south of Cape Omaezaki, about 85 nautical miles (157 km; 98 mi) from Hachijojima. She sank at 33°40′N 138°20′E, and was removed from the navy list on 10 November 1944 .
