= USS Shad (SS-235) =

Submarine of the United States

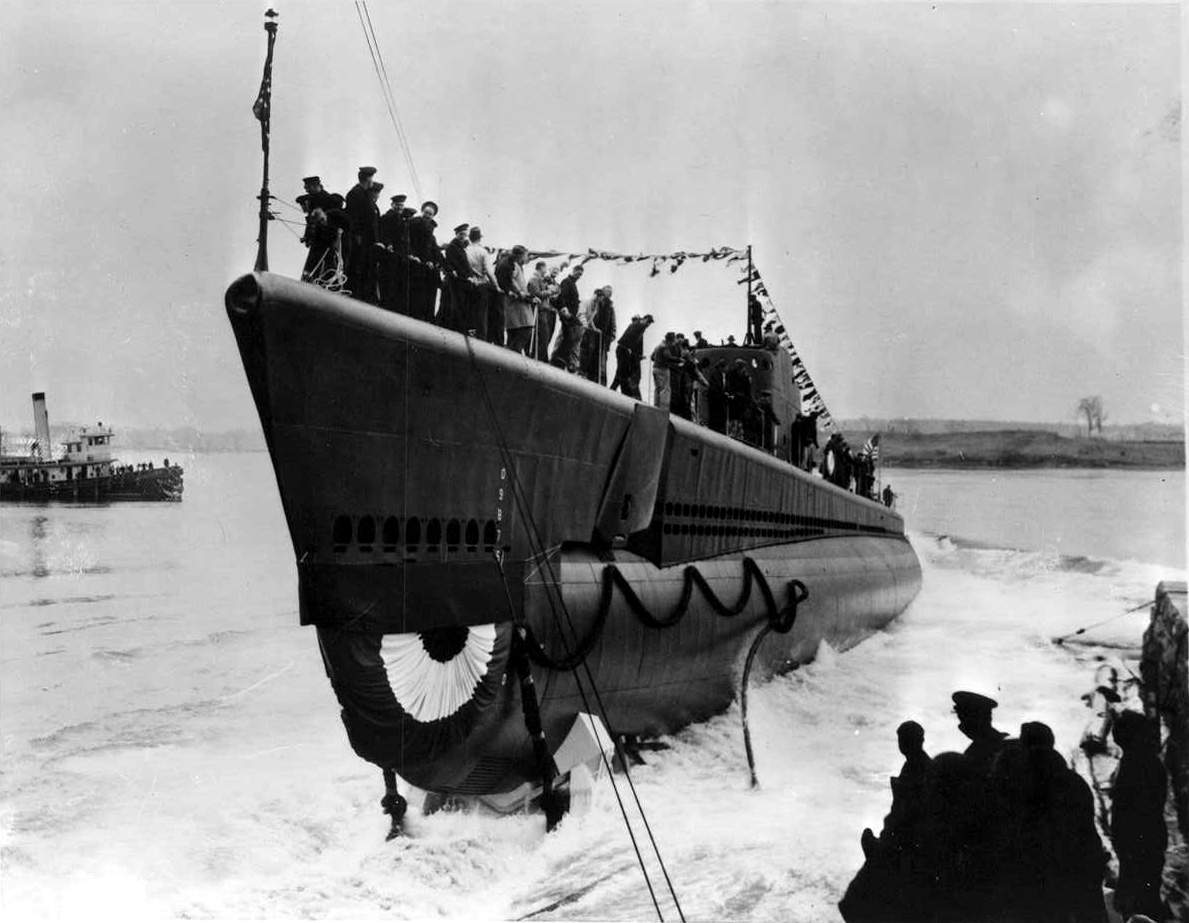
- Sliding down the launching ways, Shad, backs into the waters of the Portsmouth Navy Yard.

History

United States
- Builder: Portsmouth Naval Shipyard, Kittery, Maine
- Laid down: 24 October 1941
- Launched: 15 April 1942
- Sponsored by: Priscilla Alden Dudley
- Commissioned: 12 June 1942
- Decommissioned: 1947
- Stricken: 1 April 1960
- Fate: Sold for scrap 11 July 1960

General characteristics
- Class & type: Gato-class diesel-electric submarine
- Displacement: 1,525 long tons (1,549 t) surfaced; 2,424 long tons (2,463 t) submerged
- Length: 311 ft 9 in (95.02 m)
- Beam: 27 ft 3 in (8.31 m)
- Draft: 17 ft (5.2 m) maximum
- Propulsion: 4 × Fairbanks-Morse Model 38D8-1/8 9-cylinder opposed-piston diesel engines driving electrical generators; 2 × 126-cell Sargo batteries; 4 × high-speed Elliott electric motors with reduction gears; 2 × propellers; 5,400 shp (4.0 MW) surfaced; 2,740 shp (2.04 MW) submerged
- Speed: 21 kn (39 km/h) surfaced; 9 knots (17 km/h) submerged
- Range: 11,000 nmi (20,000 km) surfaced at 10 kn (19 km/h)
- Endurance: 48 hours at 2 kn (4 km/h) submerged; 75 days on patrol
- Test depth: 300 ft (90 m)
- Complement: 6 officers, 54 enlisted
- Armament: 10 × 21-inch (533 mm) torpedo tubes; 6 forward, 4 aft; 24 torpedoes; 1 × 3-inch (76 mm) / 50 caliber deck gun; Bofors 40 mm and Oerlikon 20 mm cannon

USS Shad (SS-235), a Gato-class submarine, was the first submarine and second vessel of the United States Navy to be named for the shad, a fish of the herring family, common along coasts of the United States.

The second Shad was laid down by the Portsmouth Navy Yard (in Kittery, Maine) on 24 October 1941. She was launched on 15 April 1942 (sponsored by Miss Priscilla Alden Dudley), and commissioned on 12 June 1942, with Lieutenant Commander Edgar J. MacGregor III (United States Naval Academy class of 1930) in command.

== Atlantic war patrols ==
Following shakedown off the New England coast, Shad departed on a special patrol as a unit of Submarine Squadron (SubRon) 50 to a point off the coast of Mehdiya, French Morocco, to conduct reconnaissance in preparation for Operation Torch, the Allied occupation of North Africa. Upon completion, she sailed to Roseneath, Scotland, for repairs and further training.

Shad's second war patrol was conducted in the Bay of Biscay and Spanish coastal waters with other units of SubRon 50 under British command. Although most of the vessels she sighted were neutral Spanish ships, the submarine sank an enemy trawler, a barge, and severely damaged a destroyer escort before she returned to Roseneath for refit on 12 February 1943.

With refitting completed, Shad departed Scotland for her third war patrol on 7 March, again heading for the Bay of Biscay. During this mission, the submarine damaged the blockade runner Pietro Orseolo, before returning to Scotland on 12 April.

Shad's fourth patrol, conducted in Norwegian waters, and fifth war patrol, conducted en route back to the United States, were uneventful.

== Sixth war patrol ==
Following repairs in New London, the submarine was transferred to the Pacific front. Arriving at Pearl Harbor on 7 September, Shad underwent two weeks of voyage repairs and then departed on 28 September, for her sixth war patrol, and her first against the Japanese. This patrol was also the first American wolfpack, comprising Shad, Cero (SS-225), and Grayback (SS-208), commanded from Cero by Captain Charles Momsen.

Just before dawn on 22 October, Shad attacked a convoy of two cruisers and three escorts. After firing 10 torpedoes, she was forced to head for deeper water to evade the depth charging that followed. Although no positive evidence of any sinkings was found, a two-square mile 2 sq mi (5.2 km^{2}) oil slick confirmed the damage done by the submarine. Shortly after midnight on 27 October, Shad sighted another enemy convoy and moved in for the kill. Although she did not sink any of the enemy ships, the submarine damaged three transports and a freighter before she was forced to leave the vicinity by an escorting destroyer. Shad then returned via Midway Atoll to Pearl Harbor, where she terminated her sixth patrol before sailing for the West Coast for overhaul at San Francisco.

== Seventh war patrol, August – October 1944 ==
After returning to Pearl Harbor on 11 May 1944, Shad underwent further repair work and training before departing on 12 August for her seventh war patrol, which she conducted in waters surrounding the Japanese home islands. While off Honshū on 30 August, the submarine attacked a heavily laden freighter escorted by two small patrol craft. Although evidence of one hit was noticed, exact results were unknown due to a severe counterattack that forced the submarine to leave the area, giving the freighter a chance to escape. On 16 September, Shad fired four torpedoes, damaging a large transport. Following this attack, the submarine endured two hours of steady depth charging.

On 19 September, Shad torpedoed and sank escort ship Ioshima, and as expected, was forced to endure another lengthy depth charging. On 22 September, Shad narrowly escaped destruction by maneuvering around two torpedoes, probably fired by an enemy submarine. One passed just under her bow and the other about 20 yards (18 m) ahead. After a typhoon-racked passage from the patrol area, Shad terminated her seventh patrol at Midway on 1 October.

== Eighth and ninth war patrols ==
Shad spent her eighth war patrol as a unit of a coordinated attack group with Redfish and Thresher, in the area off the northeast coast of Formosa and in the East China Sea. Other than a few inconsequential contacts with small enemy vessels, the patrol was uneventful, and the submarine returned to Pearl Harbor on 5 January 1945.

Following repair work and recuperation for the crew, Shad departed Pearl Harbor on 31 January for her ninth war patrol. She refueled at Saipan on 12 February and then departed with Peto and Thresher for another wolfpack to patrol the Luzon Strait. During this patrol, the Shad attempted three attacks but all were thwarted. Twice the coming of dawn forced her to dive to evade enemy aircraft, and once patrolling escort ships forced her to leave the vicinity of an anticipated victim. On 5 March, Shad again was on the receiving end of an enemy torpedo attack, with three torpedoes passing just ahead of her bow. After this unproductive patrol, the submarine arrived at Apra Harbor, Guam, on 30 March.

== Tenth war patrol, August – October 1944 ==
On her tenth war patrol, Shad operated as part of yet another coordinated attack group with Balao, Dragonet, and Spikefish, this time in the Yellow and East China Seas. On the night of 17 May, the submarine contacted a large freighter and two escorts. Shad fired three torpedoes and quickly got out of range. One torpedo hit forward on the freighter Chosan Maru, blowing her bow completely off, and the target settled quickly to the bottom. The escorts gave chase, but Shad escaped and resumed patrol.

On 7 June, Shad destroyed a small junk by gunfire, and later in the day, attacked and sank the 1,370-ton cargo ship, Azusa Maru. With her torpedo store depleted, the submarine returned to Midway.

== Eleventh war patrol and postwar service ==
On 11 July, Shad departed Midway on her 11th and final war patrol, consisting of lifeguard duty off Marcus Island. On 15 August, she received word of the cessation of hostilities and returned to Midway on 22 August. Upon completion of repairs, she returned to the United States, arriving at New Orleans, Louisiana, on 20 September.

Following the war, Shad was decommissioned and placed "in service, in reserve" and assigned to the Naval Reserve Training Center at Salem Maritime National Historic Site, within the 1st Naval District, to train naval reservists. The submarine continued in that duty until she was struck from the Navy List on 1 April 1960 and sold for scrap to Luria Brothers, Inc., of Kearney, New Jersey.

Shad earned six battle stars for World War II service.
