= HMS St Vincent (1908) =

British Royal Navy battleship

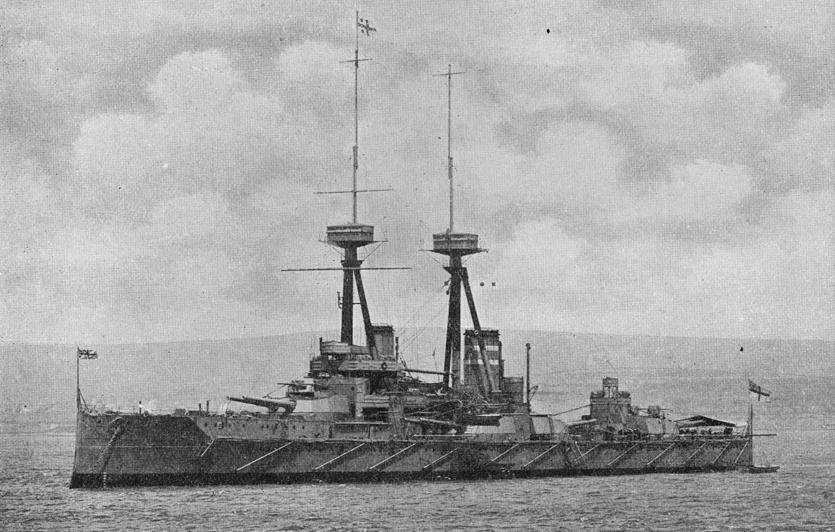
- St Vincent at the Coronation Review, Spithead, 24 June 1911

History

United Kingdom
- Name: St Vincent
- Namesake: Admiral of the Fleet John Jervis, Earl of St Vincent
- Ordered: 26 October 1907
- Builder: HM Dockyard, Portsmouth
- Laid down: 30 December 1907
- Launched: 10 September 1908
- Completed: May 1909
- Commissioned: 3 May 1910
- Decommissioned: March 1921
- Identification: Pennant number: 16 (1914); 7A (Jan 18); 85 (Apr 18); 24 (Nov 19); N.51 (Jan 22)
- Fate: Sold for scrap, 1 December 1921

General characteristics (as built)
- Class & type: St Vincent-class dreadnought battleship
- Displacement: 19,700 long tons (20,000 t) (normal)
- Length: 536 ft (163.4 m) (o/a)
- Beam: 84 ft (25.6 m)
- Draught: 28 ft (8.5 m)
- Installed power: 18 × Babcock & Wilcox boilers; 24,500 shp (18,300 kW)
- Propulsion: 4 × shafts; 2 × steam turbine sets
- Speed: 21 knots (39 km/h; 24 mph)
- Range: 6,900 nmi (12,800 km; 7,900 mi) at 10 knots (19 km/h; 12 mph)
- Complement: 756–835
- Armament: 5 × twin 12-inch (305 mm) guns; 20 × single 4-inch (102 mm) guns; 3 × 18-inch (450 mm) torpedo tubes
- Armour: Belt: 8–10 inches (203–254 mm); Deck: 0.75–3 inches (19–76 mm); Turrets: 11 inches (279 mm); Barbettes: 9 or 10 inches (229 or 254 mm)

HMS St Vincent was the lead ship of her class of three dreadnought battleships built for the Royal Navy in the first decade of the 20th century. After commissioning in 1910, she spent her whole career assigned to the Home and Grand Fleets, often serving as a flagship. Aside from participating in the Battle of Jutland in May 1916, during which she damaged a German battlecruiser, and the inconclusive action of 19 August several months later, her service during World War I generally consisted of routine patrols and training in the North Sea. The ship was deemed obsolete after the war and was reduced to reserve and used as a training ship. St Vincent was sold for scrap in 1921 and broken up the following year.

== Design and description ==
The design of the St Vincent class was derived from that of the previous Bellerophon class, with more powerful guns and slight increases in size and protection. St Vincent had an overall length of 536 feet (163.4 m), a beam of 84 feet (25.6 m), and a normal draught of 28 feet (8.5 m). She displaced 19,700 long tons (20,000 t) at normal load and 22,800 long tons (23,200 t) at deep load. Her crew numbered 756 officers and ratings in 1911, and 835 in 1915.

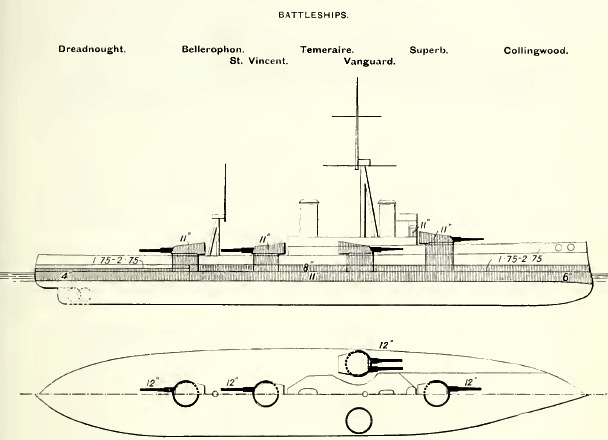
Right elevation and plan of the first generation of British dreadnoughts from the 1912 edition of Brassey's Naval Annual

St Vincent was powered by two sets of Parsons direct-drive steam turbines each driving two propeller shafts using steam provided by 18 coal-burning Babcock & Wilcox boilers. The turbines were rated at 24,500 shaft horsepower (18,300 kW) and were intended to give the ship a maximum speed of 21 knots (39 km/h; 24 mph). During her sea trials on 17 December 1909, the ship reached a top speed of 21.67 knots (40.13 km/h; 24.94 mph) from 28,218 shp (21,042 kW). St Vincent carried enough coal and fuel oil to give her a range of 6,900 nautical miles (12,800 km; 7,900 mi) at a cruising speed of 10 knots (19 km/h; 12 mph).

=== Armament and armour ===
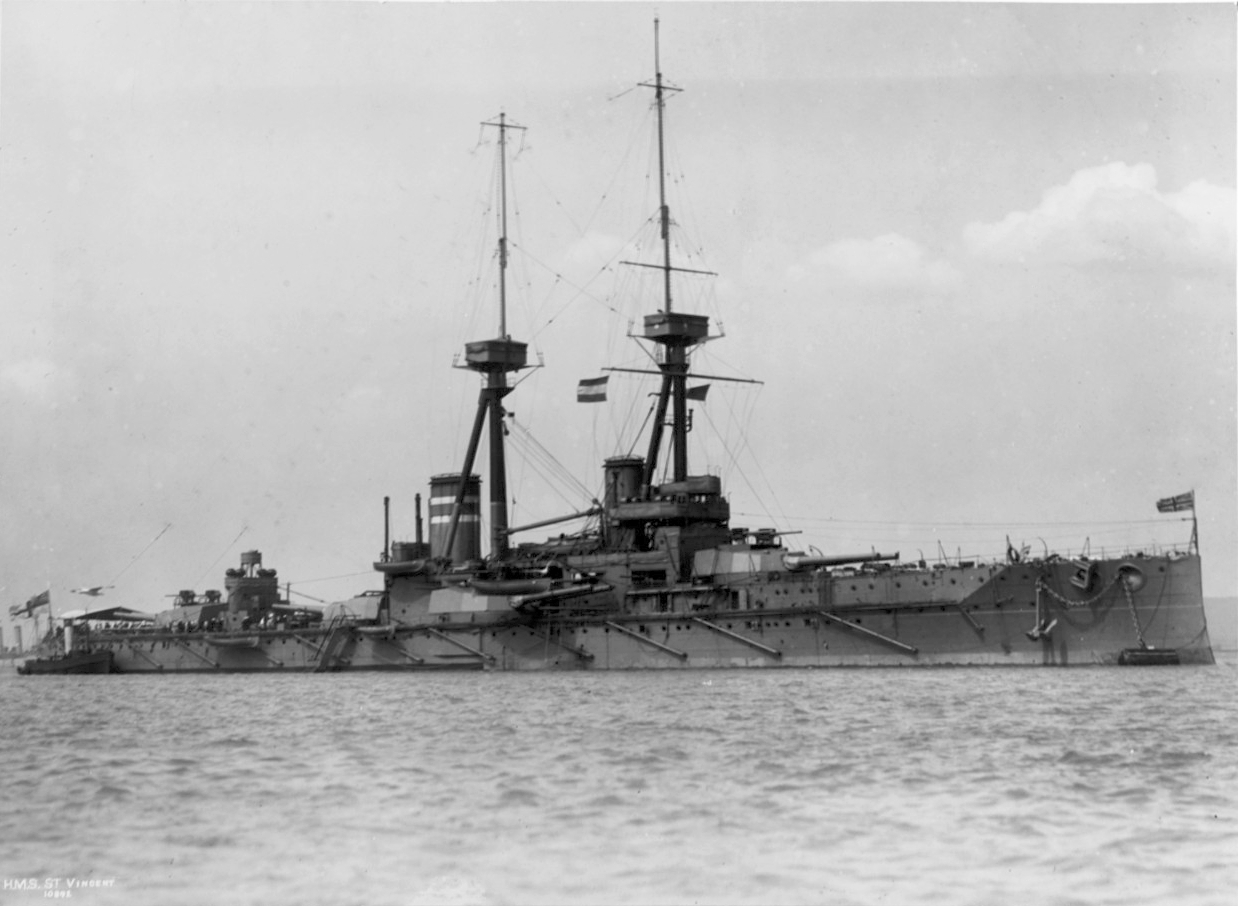
St Vincent at a mooring, before 1912

The St Vincent class was equipped with ten breech-loading (BL) 12-inch (305 mm) Mk XI guns in five twin-gun turrets, three along the centreline and the remaining two as wing turrets. The secondary, or anti-torpedo boat armament, comprised twenty BL 4-inch (102 mm) Mk VII guns. Two of these guns were each installed on the roofs of the fore and aft centreline turrets and the wing turrets in unshielded mounts, and the other ten were positioned in the superstructure. All guns were in single mounts. (Note: Sources disagree on the number, type and composition of the secondary armament. Burt gives only eighteen 4-inch guns and claims that they were the older quick-firing QF Mark III guns. In addition, he lists a 12-pounder (three-inch (76 mm)) gun. Preston concurs on the number of 4 inchers, but does not list the 12 pounder. Parkes says twenty 4-inch guns; while not identifying the type, he does say that they were 50-calibre guns and Preston agrees. Friedman shows the QF Mark III as a 40-calibre gun and states that the 50-calibre BL Mark VII gun armed all of the early dreadnoughts.) The ships were also fitted with three 18-inch (450 mm) torpedo tubes, one on each broadside and the third in the stern.

The St Vincent-class ships were protected by a waterline 10-inch (254 mm) armoured belt that extended between the end barbettes. Their decks ranged in thickness between 0.75 to 3 inches (19 to 76 mm) with the thickest portions protecting the steering gear in the stern. The main battery turret faces were 11 inches (279 mm) thick, and the turrets were supported by 9-or-10-inch-thick (229 or 254 mm) barbettes.

==== Modifications ====
The guns on the forward turret roof were removed in 1911–1912 and the upper forward pair of guns in the superstructure were removed in 1913–1914. In addition, gun shields were fitted to all guns in the superstructure and the bridge structure was enlarged around the base of the forward tripod mast. During the first year of the war, a fire-control director was installed high on the forward tripod mast. Around the same time, the base of the forward superstructure was rebuilt to house 4 four-inch guns and the turret-top guns were removed, which reduced her secondary armament to a total of fourteen guns. In addition, a pair of three-inch (76 mm) anti-aircraft (AA) guns were added.

Approximately 50 long tons (51 t) of additional deck armour was added after the Battle of Jutland. By April 1917, St Vincent mounted 13 four-inch anti-torpedo boat guns as well as one four-inch and one three-inch AA gun, and the ship was modified to operate a kite balloon around the same time. In 1918 a high-angle rangefinder was fitted and the stern torpedo tube was removed before the end of the war.

== Construction and career ==
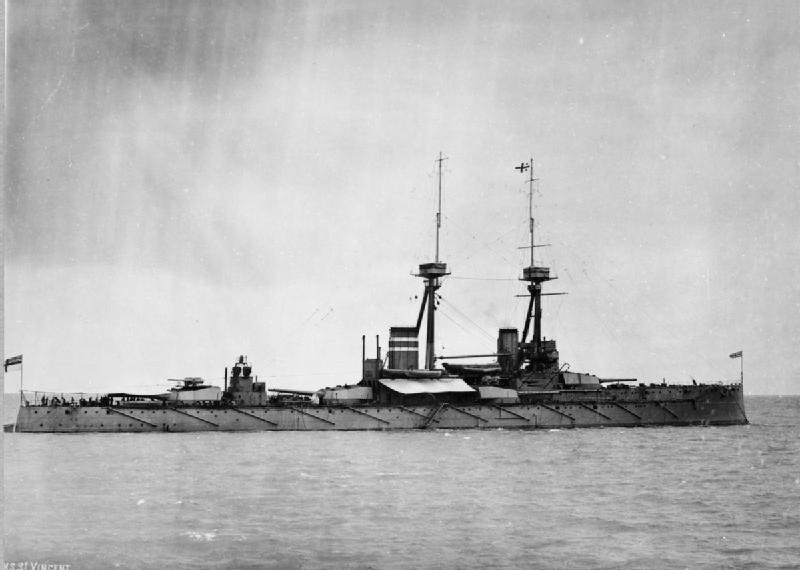
St Vincent at anchor, about 1911

St Vincent, named after Admiral of the Fleet John Jervis, 1st Earl of St Vincent (1735 – 1823), was ordered on 26 October 1907. She was laid down at HM Dockyard, Portsmouth, on the same date, launched on 10 September 1908 and completed in May 1909. Including her armament, her cost is variously quoted at £1,721,970 or £1,754,615. She was commissioned on 3 May 1910 and assigned as the junior flagship of the 1st Division of the Home Fleet. She was commanded by Captain Douglas Nicholson and was present in Torbay when King George V visited the fleet in late July. St Vincent also participated in the Coronation Fleet Review at Spithead on 24 June 1911. On 1 May 1912, the 1st Division was renamed the 1st Battle Squadron. The ship participated in the Parliamentary Naval Review on 9 July at Spithead before beginning a lengthy refit late in the year. On 21 April 1914, she was recommissioned and resumed her role as the flagship of the second-in-command of the 1st Battle Squadron, Rear-Admiral Hugh Evan-Thomas.

=== World War I ===
Between 17 and 20 July 1914, St Vincent took part in a test mobilisation and fleet review as part of the British response to the July Crisis. Arriving in Portland on 27 July, she was ordered to proceed with the rest of the Home Fleet to Scapa Flow two days later to safeguard the fleet from a possible surprise attack by the Imperial German Navy. In August 1914, following the outbreak of World War I, the Home Fleet was reorganised as the Grand Fleet, and placed under the command of Admiral John Jellicoe. On the evening of 22 November 1914, the Grand Fleet conducted a fruitless sweep in the southern half of the North Sea; St Vincent stood with the main body in support of Vice-Admiral David Beatty's 1st Battlecruiser Squadron. The fleet was back in port in Scapa Flow by 27 November. The 1st Battle Squadron cruised north-west of the Shetland Islands and conducted gunnery practice on 8–12 December. Four days later, the Grand Fleet sortied during the German raid on Scarborough, Hartlepool and Whitby, but failed to make contact with the High Seas Fleet. St Vincent and the rest of the Grand Fleet conducted another sweep of the North Sea on 25–27 December.

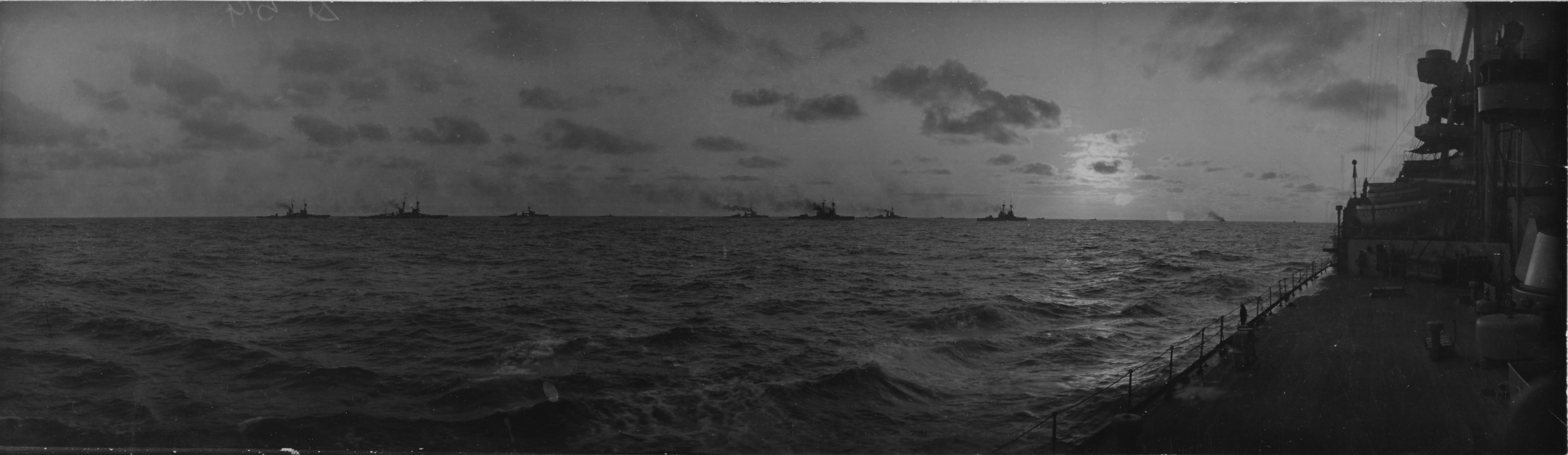
The 1st Battle Squadron at sea, April 1915

Jellicoe's ships, including St Vincent, conducted gunnery drills on 10–13 January 1915 west of the Orkney and Shetland Islands. On the evening of 23 January, the bulk of the Grand Fleet sailed in support of Beatty's battlecruisers, but the fleet was too far away to participate in the Battle of Dogger Bank the following day. On 7–10 March, the Grand Fleet conducted a sweep in the northern North Sea, during which it conducted training manoeuvres. Another such cruise took place on 16–19 March. On 11 April, the Grand Fleet conducted a patrol in the central North Sea and returned to port on 14 April; another patrol in the area took place on 17–19 April, followed by gunnery drills off Shetland on 20–21 April.

The Grand Fleet conducted sweeps into the central North Sea on 17–19 May and 29–31 May without encountering any German vessels. During 11–14 June the fleet conducted gunnery practice and battle exercises west of Shetland. King George V inspected all of the personnel of the 2nd Division aboard St Vincent during his visit to Scapa on 8 July and the Grand Fleet conducted training off Shetland beginning three days later. On 2–5 September, the fleet went on another cruise in the northern end of the North Sea and conducted gunnery drills. Throughout the rest of the month, the Grand Fleet conducted numerous training exercises. The ship, together with the majority of the Grand Fleet, conducted another sweep into the North Sea from 13 to 15 October. Almost three weeks later, St Vincent participated in another fleet training operation west of Orkney during 2–5 November. She became a private ship that month when she was relieved by Colossus as flagship.

The fleet departed for a cruise in the North Sea on 26 February 1916; Jellicoe had intended to use the Harwich Force of cruisers and destroyers to sweep the Heligoland Bight, but bad weather prevented operations in the southern North Sea. As a result, the operation was confined to the northern end of the sea. Another sweep began on 6 March, but had to be abandoned the following day as the weather grew too severe for the escorting destroyers. On the night of 25 March, St Vincent and the rest of the fleet sailed from Scapa Flow to support Beatty's battlecruisers and other light forces raiding the German Zeppelin base at Tondern. By the time the Grand Fleet approached the area on 26 March, the British and German forces had already disengaged and a strong gale threatened the light craft, so the fleet was ordered to return to base. On 21 April, the Grand Fleet conducted a demonstration off Horns Reef to distract the Germans while the Imperial Russian Navy relaid its defensive minefields in the Baltic Sea. The fleet returned to Scapa Flow on 24 April and refuelled before proceeding south in response to intelligence reports that the Germans were about to launch a raid on Lowestoft, but only arrived in the area after the Germans had withdrawn. On 2–4 May, the fleet conducted another demonstration off Horns Reef to keep German attention focused on the North Sea.

==== Battle of Jutland ====
Maps showing the manoeuvres of the British (blue) and German (red) fleets on 31 May – 1 June 1916

In an attempt to lure out and destroy a portion of the Grand Fleet, the High Seas Fleet, composed of 16 dreadnoughts, 6 pre-dreadnoughts, and supporting ships, departed the Jade Bight early on the morning of 31 May. The fleet sailed in concert with Rear Admiral Franz von Hipper's 5 battlecruisers. The Royal Navy's Room 40 had intercepted and decrypted German radio traffic containing plans of the operation. In response the Admiralty ordered the Grand Fleet, totalling some 28 dreadnoughts and 9 battlecruisers, to sortie the night before to cut off and destroy the High Seas Fleet. St Vincent, under the command of Captain William Fisher, was assigned to the 5th Division of the 1st Battle Squadron at this time. Shortly after 14:20, (Note: The times used in this section are in UT, which is one hour behind CET, which is often used in German works.) Fisher semaphored the Grand Fleet's flagship, Iron Duke, that his ship was monitoring strong radio signals on the frequency used by the High Seas Fleet that implied the Germans were nearby. Detection of further signals was communicated at 14:52.

As the Grand Fleet began deploying from columns into a line of battle beginning at 18:15, the 5th Division was near the rear. St Vincent, the twentieth ship from the head of the battle line after deployment, was briefly forced to stop to avoid overrunning ships further forward as the fleet had been forced to slow to 14 knots (26 km/h; 16 mph) to allow the battlecruisers to assume their position at the head of the line. During the first stage of the general engagement, the ship began firing a few salvos from her main guns at the crippled light cruiser SMS Wiesbaden at 18:33, although the number of hits made, if any, is unknown. Between 18:40 and 19:00 the ship turned away twice from what were thought to be torpedoes that stopped short of the ship. From 19:10 St Vincent began firing at what was initially identified as a German battleship, but proved to be the battlecruiser SMS Moltke, hitting her target twice before she disappeared into the mist. The first armour-piercing, capped (APC) shell was probably a ricochet and struck the upper hull abreast the bridge. It wrecked the sickbay and slightly damaged the surrounding superstructure and hull, which caused some minor flooding. One man in the conning tower was wounded by a splinter. The second hit penetrated the rear armour of the superfiring turret at the rear of the ship, wrecking it and starting a small fire that was easily extinguished by the crew. This was the last time that St Vincent fired her guns during the battle. The ship fired a total of 98 twelve-inch shells (90 APC and 8 common-pointed, capped) during the battle.

==== Subsequent activity ====
After the battle, the ship was transferred to the 4th Battle Squadron. The Grand Fleet sortied on 18 August to ambush the High Seas Fleet while it advanced into the southern North Sea, but a series of miscommunications and mistakes prevented Jellicoe from intercepting the German fleet before it returned to port. Two light cruisers were sunk by German U-boats during the operation; Jellicoe decided not to risk the major units of the fleet south of 55° 30' North due to the threat from submarines and mines. The Admiralty concurred and stipulated that the Grand Fleet would not sortie unless the German fleet was attempting an invasion of Britain or there was a strong possibility it could be forced into an engagement under suitable conditions.

On 24 April 1918, St Vincent was under repair at Invergordon, Scotland, when she and the dreadnought Hercules were ordered north to reinforce the forces based at Scapa Flow and Orkney when the High Seas Fleet sortied north for the last time to intercept a convoy to Norway. She was unable to leave port before the Germans turned back after Moltke suffered engine damage. The ship was present at Rosyth when the German fleet surrendered on 21 November. In March 1919, she was reduced to reserve and became a gunnery training ship at Portsmouth. St Vincent then became flagship of the Reserve Fleet in June and was relieved as gunnery training ship in December when she was transferred to Rosyth. There she remained until listed for disposal in March 1921 as obsolete. She was sold to the Stanlee Shipbreaking & Salvage Co. for scrap on 1 December 1921 and towed to Dover for demolition in March 1922.

== Bibliography ==
- Burt, R. A. (1986). British Battleships of World War One. Annapolis, Maryland: Naval Institute Press. ISBN 978-0-87021-863-7.
- Campbell, N. J. M. (1986). Jutland: An Analysis of the Fighting. Annapolis, Maryland: Naval Institute Press. ISBN 0-87021-324-5.
- Corbett, Julian (1997) [1940]. Naval Operations. History of the Great War: Based on Official Documents. Vol. III (Second ed.). London and Nashville, Tennessee: Imperial War Museum in association with the Battery Press. ISBN 1-870423-50-X.
- Friedman, Norman (2011). Naval Weapons of World War One: Guns, Torpedoes, Mines and ASW Weapons of All Nations; An Illustrated Directory. Barnsley, UK: Seaforth Publishing. ISBN 978-1-84832-100-7.
- Gordon, Andrew (2012). The Rules of the Game: Jutland and British Naval Command. Annapolis, Maryland: Naval Institute Press. ISBN 978-1-59114-336-9.
- Halpern, Paul G. (1995). A Naval History of World War I. Annapolis, Maryland: Naval Institute Press. ISBN 1-55750-352-4.
- Jellicoe, John (1919). The Grand Fleet, 1914–1916: Its Creation, Development, and Work. New York: George H. Doran Company. OCLC 13614571.
- Massie, Robert K. (2003). Castles of Steel: Britain, Germany, and the Winning of the Great War at Sea. New York: Random House. ISBN 0-679-45671-6.
- Newbolt, Henry (1996) [1931]. Naval Operations. History of the Great War Based on Official Documents. Vol. V. Nashville, Tennessee: Battery Press. ISBN 0-89839-255-1.
- Parkes, Oscar (1990) [1966]. British Battleships, Warrior 1860 to Vanguard 1950: A History of Design, Construction, and Armament (New & rev. ed.). Annapolis, Maryland: Naval Institute Press. ISBN 1-55750-075-4.
- Preston, Antony (1972). Battleships of World War I: An Illustrated Encyclopedia of the Battleships of All Nations 1914–1918. New York: Galahad Books. ISBN 0-88365-300-1.
- Preston, Antony (1985). "Great Britain and Empire Forces". In Gray, Randal (ed.). Conway's All the World's Fighting Ships 1906–1921. Annapolis, Maryland: Naval Institute Press. pp. 1–104. ISBN 0-85177-245-5.
- Silverstone, Paul H. (1984). Directory of the World's Capital Ships. New York: Hippocrene Books. ISBN 0-88254-979-0.
- Tarrant, V. E. (1999) [1995]. Jutland: The German Perspective: A New View of the Great Battle, 31 May 1916. London: Brockhampton Press. ISBN 1-86019-917-8.
