= BL 12 inch naval gun =

BL 12 inch naval gun can refer to a number of guns used by the British Royal Navy:

- BL 12 inch naval gun Mk VIII
- Armstrong Whitworth 12 inch /40 naval gun known as the "BL 12 inch Mark IX"
- BL 12 inch Mk X naval gun
- BL 12 inch Mk XI - XII naval guns
- EOC 12 inch /45 naval gun known as the "Bl 12 inch Mark XIII"
