= HMS Colossus (1910) =

1911 Colossus-class battleship of the United Kingdom

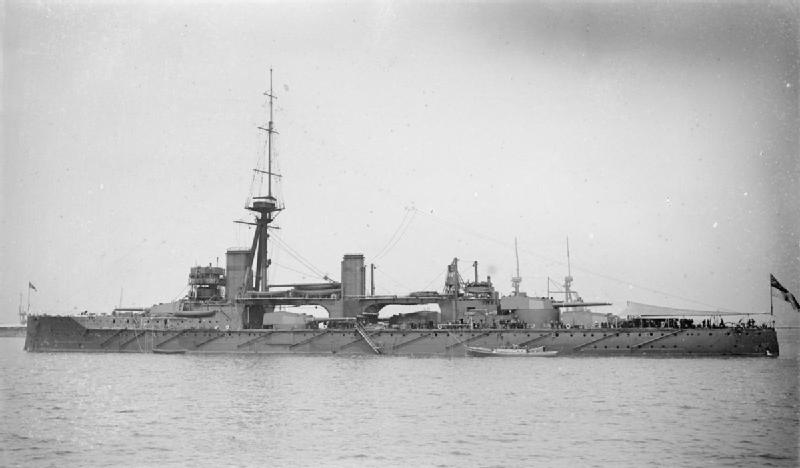
- Colossus at anchor, shortly after completion, 1911

History

United Kingdom
- Name: Colossus
- Namesake: Colossus of Rhodes
- Ordered: 1 June 1909
- Builder: Scotts, Greenock
- Laid down: 8 July 1909
- Launched: 9 April 1910
- Completed: July 1911
- Commissioned: 8 August 1911
- Reclassified: As a training ship, 1921
- Stricken: 1923
- Fate: Sold for scrap, July 1928

General characteristics
- Class & type: Colossus-class dreadnought battleship
- Displacement: 20,030 long tons (20,350 t) (normal)
- Length: 545 ft 9 in (166.3 m) (o/a)
- Beam: 86 ft 8 in (26.4 m)
- Draught: 27 ft (8.2 m)
- Installed power: 25,000 shp (19,000 kW); 18 × Babcock & Wilcox boilers
- Propulsion: 4 × shafts; 2 × steam turbine sets
- Speed: 21 knots (39 km/h; 24 mph)
- Range: 6,680 nmi (12,370 km; 7,690 mi) at 10 knots (19 km/h; 12 mph)
- Complement: 751
- Armament: 5 × twin 12-inch (305 mm) guns; 16 × single 4-inch (102 mm) guns; 3 × 21-inch (533 mm) torpedo tubes
- Armour: Belt: 8–11 in (203–279 mm); Deck: 1.5–4 inches (38–102 mm); Turrets: 11 in (280 mm); Barbettes: 4–11 inches (102–279 mm); Bulkheads: 4 and 8 in (102 and 203 mm); Conning tower: 11 in (280 mm)

HMS Colossus was the lead ship of her class of two dreadnought battleships built for the Royal Navy at the end of the first decade of the 20th century. She spent her whole career assigned to the Home and Grand Fleets, often serving as a flagship. Aside from participating in the Battle of Jutland in May 1916 and the inconclusive action of 19 August, her service during World War I generally consisted of routine patrols and training in the North Sea. Colossus was the only dreadnought from the main body of the Grand Fleet to be hit during the Battle of Jutland, although she suffered only minor damage. The ship was deemed obsolete after the war and was reduced to reserve and then became a training ship. Colossus was hulked in 1923 and sold for scrap in 1928.

== Design and description ==
The design of the Colossus class was derived from that of the earlier HMS Neptune with redistributed armour and more powerful torpedoes. Colossus had an overall length of 545 feet 9 inches (166.3 m), a beam of 86 feet 8 inches (26.4 m), and a normal draught of 27 feet (8.2 m). She displaced 20,030 long tons (20,350 t) at normal load and 23,266 long tons (23,639 t) at deep load. In 1911 her crew numbered 751 officers and ratings.

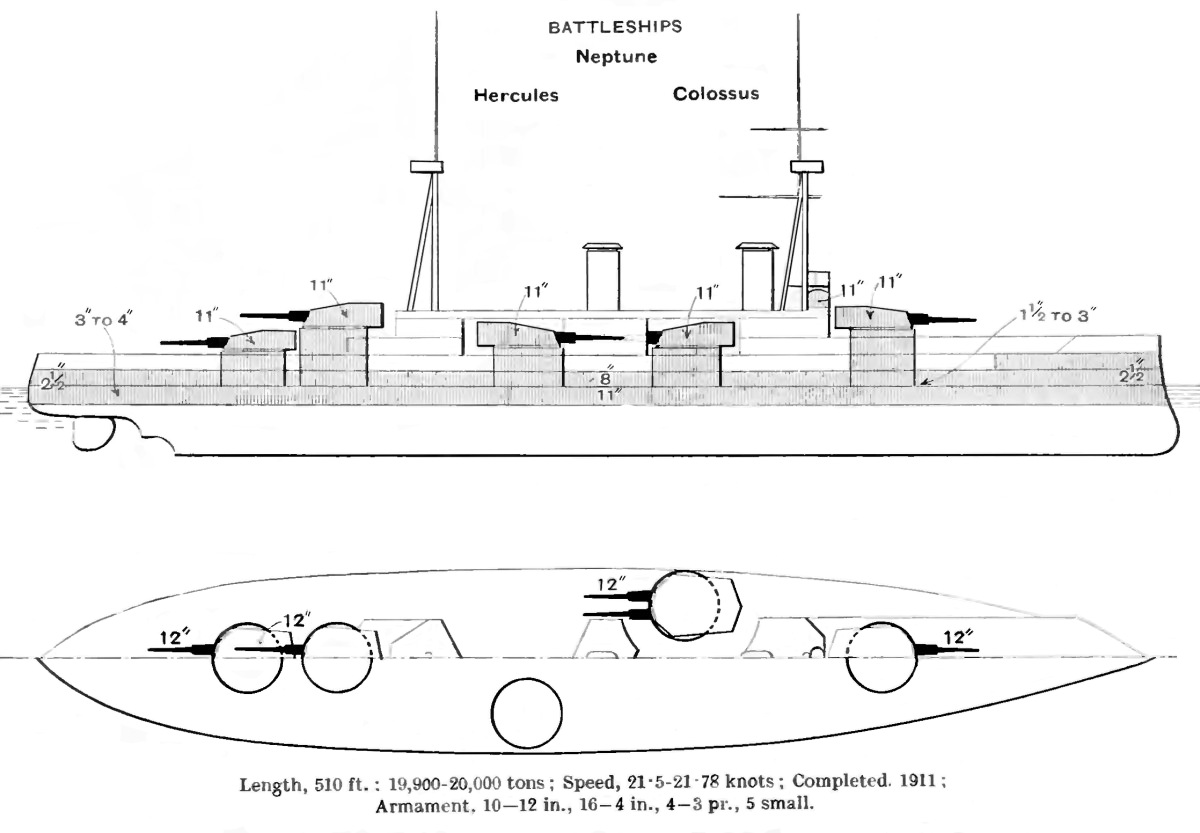
Right elevation and plan from Brassey's Naval Annual 1915. This diagram shows masts for HMS Neptune as the Colossus class had only a foremast, positioned behind the forward funnel.

Colossus was powered by two sets of Parsons direct-drive steam turbines, each driving two shafts, using steam from eighteen Babcock & Wilcox boilers. The turbines were rated at 25,000 shp (19,000 kW) and were intended to give the ship a maximum speed of 21 knots (39 km/h; 24 mph). During her full-power, eight-hour sea trials on 30 March 1911, she reached a top speed of 21.6 knots (40.0 km/h; 24.9 mph) from 29,296 shp (21,846 kW) in a moderate storm. The Colossus-class ships carried enough coal and fuel oil to give them a range of 6,680 nautical miles (12,370 km; 7,690 mi) at a cruising speed of 10 knots (19 km/h; 12 mph).

=== Armament and armour ===
The Colossus class was equipped with ten breech-loading (BL) 12-inch (305 mm) Mark XI guns in five hydraulically powered twin-gun turrets, three along the centreline and the remaining two as wing turrets. The centreline turrets were designated 'A', 'X' and 'Y', from front to rear, and the port and starboard wing turrets were 'P' and 'Q' respectively. Their secondary armament consisted of sixteen BL 4-inch (102 mm) Mark VII guns. Ten of these were mounted in the forward superstructure and six in the aft superstructure in single mounts. Four 3-pounder (1.9 in (47 mm)) saluting guns were also carried. The ships were equipped with three 21-inch (533 mm) submerged torpedo tubes, one on each broadside and another in the stern, for which 18 torpedoes were provided.

They had a waterline belt of Krupp cemented armour that was 11 inches (279 mm) thick between the fore and aftmost barbettes that did not cover the full length of the ships. Above this was a strake of 8 inches (203 mm) armour. The forward oblique 4-inch bulkheads connected the forward barbette to the side armour. Similarly, the aft bulkhead connected them to the rearmost barbette, although it was 8 inches thick. The three centreline barbettes were protected by armour 10 inches (254 mm) thick above the main deck and thinned to 4 inches below it. The wing barbettes were similar except that they had 11 inches of armour on their outer faces. The gun turrets had 11-inch faces and sides with 3-inch (76 mm) roofs.

The three armoured decks ranged in thickness from 1.5 to 4 inches (38 to 102 mm) with the greater thicknesses outside the central armoured citadel. The front and sides of the conning tower were protected by 11-inch plates, although the rear and roof were 8 inches and 3 inches thick respectively. The torpedo control tower aft had 3-inch sides and a 2-inch roof. In an effort to reduce weight, the Colossus-class ships reverted to the inadequate underwater protection scheme of HMS Dreadnought and their anti-torpedo bulkheads only protected the shell rooms and magazines, although they had a maximum thickness of 3 inches.

==== Modifications ====
Sometime in 1912, the compass platform was extended forward to accommodate a rangefinder. After the start of the war in August 1914, a pair of 3-inch anti-aircraft (AA) guns were added. A fire-control director was installed on a platform below the spotting top before December 1915. Approximately 50 long tons (51 t) of additional deck armour was added after the Battle of Jutland in May 1916. Around the same time, four 4-inch guns were removed from the aft superstructure. By April 1917, Colossus was equipped with single 4-inch and 3-inch AA guns and the forward group of 4-inch guns had been enclosed in casemates. The stern torpedo tube was removed in 1917–1918 and a high-angle rangefinder was fitted on the spotting top in 1918. The AA guns were removed in 1919–1920 and some 4-inch guns were removed during her September–October 1921 refit. In addition, some machinery was removed during the refit to render her non-combat worthy in accordance with the Washington Naval Treaty.

== Construction and career ==
Colossus, named after the Colossus of Rhodes, was the fifth ship of her name to serve in the Royal Navy (RN). The ship was ordered on 1 June 1909 and laid down at Scotts Shipbuilding & Engineering at their shipyard in Greenock on 8 July. She was launched on 9 April 1910 and completed in July 1911 at the cost of £1,672,102, including her armament. The ship began trials on 28 February that lasted until July. Colossus commissioned at Devonport on 8 August and was assigned to the 2nd Division of the Home Fleet. This was redesignated as the 2nd Battle Squadron (BS) on 1 May 1912. The ship participated in the Parliamentary Naval Review on 9 July at Spithead and became the temporary flagship of the squadron while her sister ship, Hercules, was being refitted in November–December. During this time, she conducted gunnery practice off Portland at a range of 14,000 yards (13,000 m), the longest shoot performed by any ship of the RN before the start of the war. Shortly afterwards, Colossus was transferred to the 1st BS. She visited Cherbourg, France, with part of the fleet in March 1913.

=== World War I ===
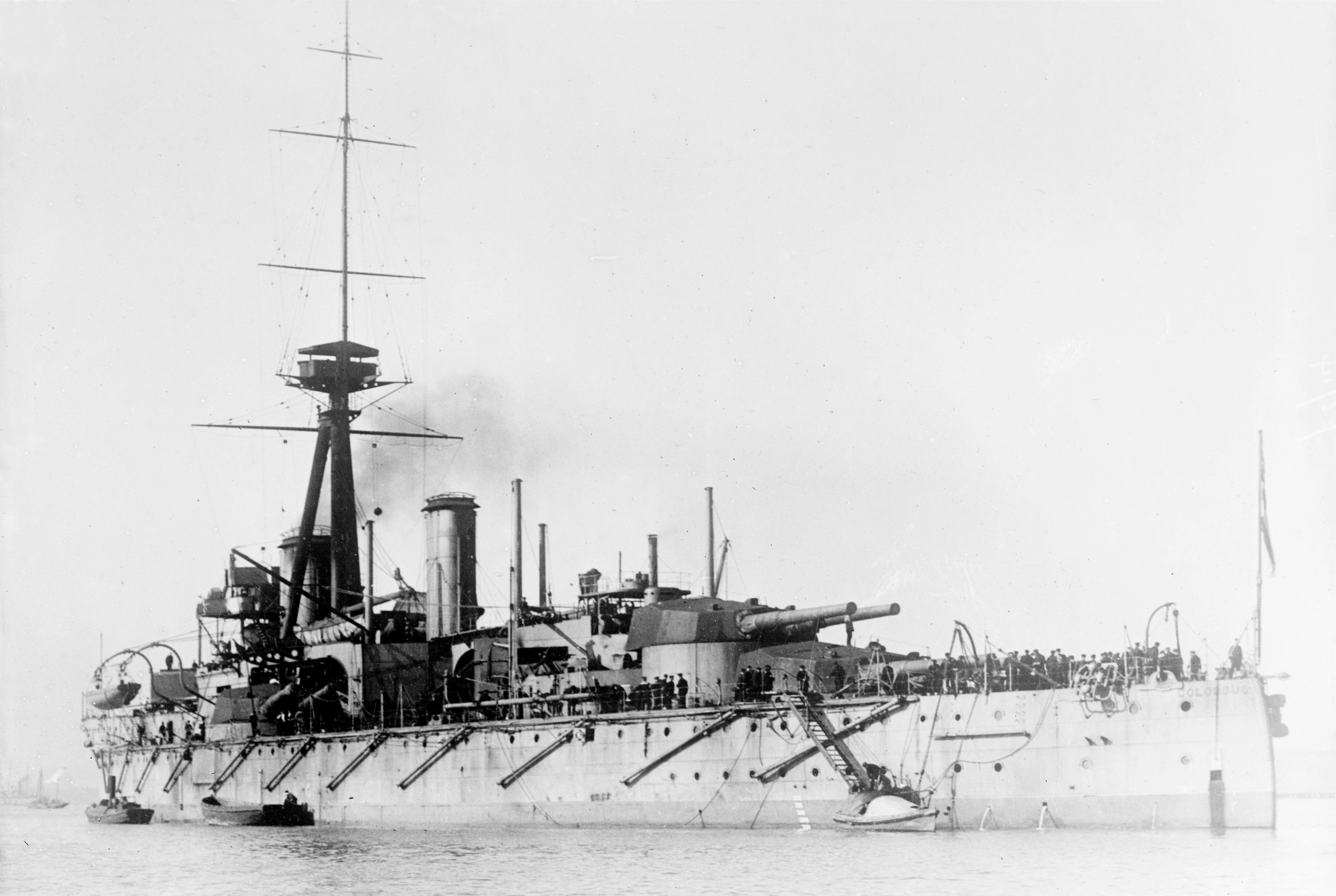
Colossus at anchor, before 1915

Between 17 and 20 July 1914, Colossus took part in a test mobilisation and fleet review as part of the British response to the July Crisis. Arriving in Portland on 25 July, she was ordered to proceed with the rest of the Home Fleet to Scapa Flow four days later to safeguard the fleet from a possible surprise attack by the Imperial German Navy. While at Portland, two engineers were killed in an accident whilst coaling on 28 July. In August 1914, following the outbreak of World War I, the Home Fleet was reorganised as the Grand Fleet, and placed under the command of Admiral Sir John Jellicoe. Most of it was briefly based (22 October to 3 November) at Lough Swilly, Ireland, while the defences at Scapa were strengthened. On the evening of 22 November 1914, the Grand Fleet conducted a fruitless sweep in the southern half of the North Sea; Colossus stood with the main body in support of Vice-Admiral David Beatty's 1st Battlecruiser Squadron. The fleet was back in port in Scapa Flow by 27 November. The 1st BS cruised north-west of the Shetland Islands and conducted gunnery practice on 8–12 December. Four days later, the Grand Fleet sortied during the German raid on Scarborough, Hartlepool and Whitby, but failed to make contact with the High Seas Fleet. Colossus and the rest of the Grand Fleet conducted another sweep of the North Sea on 25–27 December.

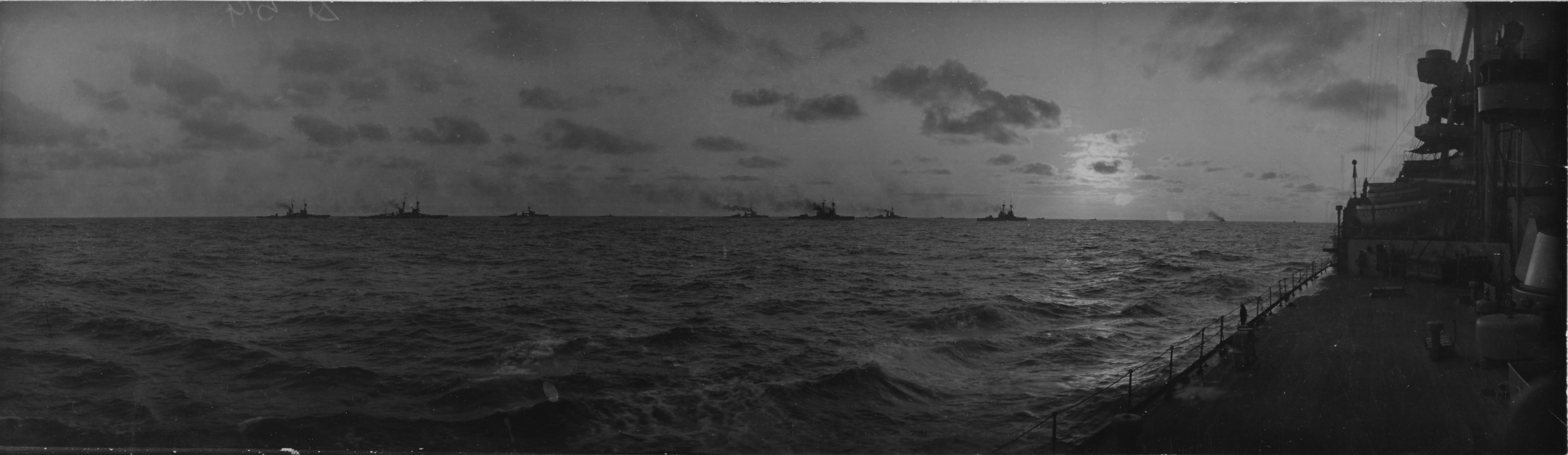
The 1st Battle Squadron at sea, April 1915

Jellicoe's ships, including Colossus, conducted gunnery drills on 10–13 January 1915 west of Orkney and Shetland. On the evening of 23 January, the bulk of the Grand Fleet sailed in support of Beatty's battlecruisers, but Colossus and the rest of the fleet did not participate in the ensuing Battle of Dogger Bank the following day. On 7–10 March, the Grand Fleet conducted a sweep in the northern North Sea, during which it conducted training manoeuvres. Another such cruise took place on 16–19 March. On 11 April, the Grand Fleet conducted a patrol in the central North Sea and returned to port on 14 April; another patrol in the area took place on 17–19 April, followed by gunnery drills off Shetland on 20–21 April.

The Grand Fleet conducted sweeps into the central North Sea on 17–19 May and 29–31 May without encountering any German vessels. During 11–14 June, the fleet conducted gunnery practice and battle exercises west of Shetland and more training off Shetland beginning on 11 July. On 2–5 September, the fleet went on another cruise in the northern end of the North Sea and conducted gunnery drills. Throughout the rest of the month, the Grand Fleet conducted numerous training exercises. The ship, together with the majority of the Grand Fleet, conducted another sweep into the North Sea from 13 to 15 October. Almost three weeks later, Colossus participated in another fleet training operation west of Orkney during 2–5 November. Later that month, the ship became the flagship of Rear-Admiral Ernest Gaunt, commander of the 5th Division of the 1st BS.

The fleet departed for a cruise in the North Sea on 26 February 1916; Jellicoe had intended to use the Harwich Force to sweep the Heligoland Bight, but bad weather prevented operations in the southern North Sea. As a result, the operation was confined to the northern end of the sea. Another sweep began on 6 March, but had to be abandoned the following day as the weather grew too severe for the escorting destroyers. On the night of 25 March, Colossus and the rest of the fleet sailed from Scapa Flow to support Beatty's battlecruisers and other light forces raiding the German Zeppelin base at Tondern. By the time the Grand Fleet approached the area on 26 March, the British and German forces had already disengaged and a strong gale threatened the light craft, so the fleet was ordered to return to base. On 21 April, the Grand Fleet conducted a demonstration off Horns Reef to distract the Germans while the Imperial Russian Navy relaid its defensive minefields in the Baltic Sea. The fleet returned to Scapa Flow on 24 April and refuelled before proceeding south in response to intelligence reports that the Germans were about to launch a raid on Lowestoft, but only arrived in the area after the Germans had withdrawn. On 2–4 May, the fleet conducted another demonstration off Horns Reef to keep German attention focused on the North Sea.

==== Battle of Jutland ====
Maps showing the manoeuvres of the British (blue) and German (red) fleets on 31 May – 1 June 1916

In an attempt to lure out and destroy a portion of the Grand Fleet, the High Seas Fleet, composed of sixteen dreadnoughts, six pre-dreadnoughts and supporting ships, departed the Jade Bight early on the morning of 31 May. The fleet sailed in concert with Rear Admiral Franz von Hipper's five battlecruisers. The Royal Navy's Room 40 had intercepted and decrypted German radio traffic containing plans of the operation. In response the Admiralty ordered the Grand Fleet, totalling some 28 dreadnoughts and 9 battlecruisers, to sortie the night before to cut off and destroy the High Seas Fleet.

On 31 May, Colossus, under the command of Captain Dudley Pound, was the lead ship of the 5th Division and was the seventeenth ship from the head of the battle line after deployment. During the first stage of the general engagement, the ship fired three salvos from her main guns at a barely visible battleship at 18:30. (Note: The times used in this section are in UT, which is one hour behind CET, which is often used in German works.) Shortly afterward, she fired four salvos at the crippled light cruiser SMS Wiesbaden around 18:32. Colossus fired another three salvos at Wiesbaden at 19:00 and switched to the destroyer SMS G42, which was attempting to come to Wiesbaden's assistance, five minutes later with both her main and secondary armament. The destroyer was not hit, but the detonations of the near misses caused her condensers to spring leaks, which gradually reduced her speed. About 19:10 Colossus engaged several German destroyer flotillas with her forward turret and 4-inch guns without result.

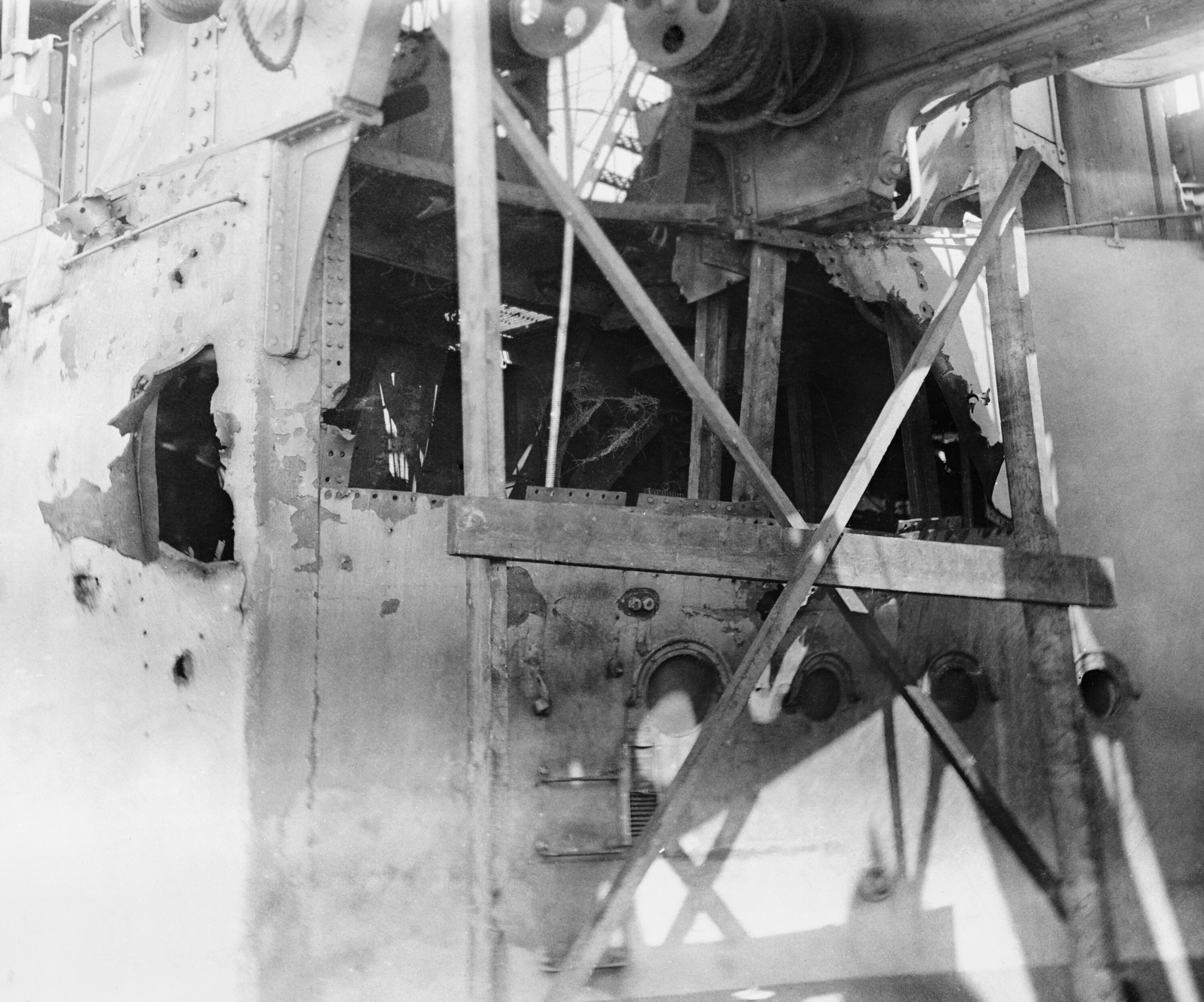
The damage caused by one hit by Seydlitz in the superstructure

About 19:15, she engaged the battlecruiser SMS Derfflinger at a range of only 8,000–9,000 yards (7,300–8,200 m) with five salvos of armour-piercing, capped (APC) shells. She claimed four hits, but likely made five on the German ship. Only two of these were significant, destroying a pair of 15-centimetre (5.9 in) guns, knocking out two others, and causing some flooding. In return she was struck by two shells fired by the battlecruiser SMS Seydlitz at 19:16, but neither caused any significant damage, splinters igniting a few 4-inch propellant charges that were easily put out. Seven men, however, were wounded. A few minutes later, splinters from two near misses wrecked a searchlight and wounded two men. At 19:35, Colossus had to turn away from an approaching German torpedo. The ship did not fire her guns again and was not hit again, although her propellers were slightly damaged when she scraped over a wreck at 23:30. During the battle she fired a total of 93 twelve-inch shells (81 APC and 12 common pointed, capped) and 16 shells from her four-inch guns.

==== Subsequent activity ====
On 12 June, Gaunt and Colossus were transferred to the 4th Battle Squadron and Gaunt became the squadron's second-in-command. The Grand Fleet sortied on 18 August to ambush the High Seas Fleet while it advanced into the southern North Sea, but a series of miscommunications and mistakes prevented Jellicoe from intercepting the German fleet before it returned to port. Two light cruisers were sunk by German U-boats during the operation, prompting Jellicoe to decide to not risk the major units of the fleet south of 55° 30' North due to the prevalence of German submarines and mines. The Admiralty concurred and stipulated that the Grand Fleet would not sortie unless the German fleet was attempting an invasion of Britain or there was a strong possibility it could be forced into an engagement under suitable conditions.

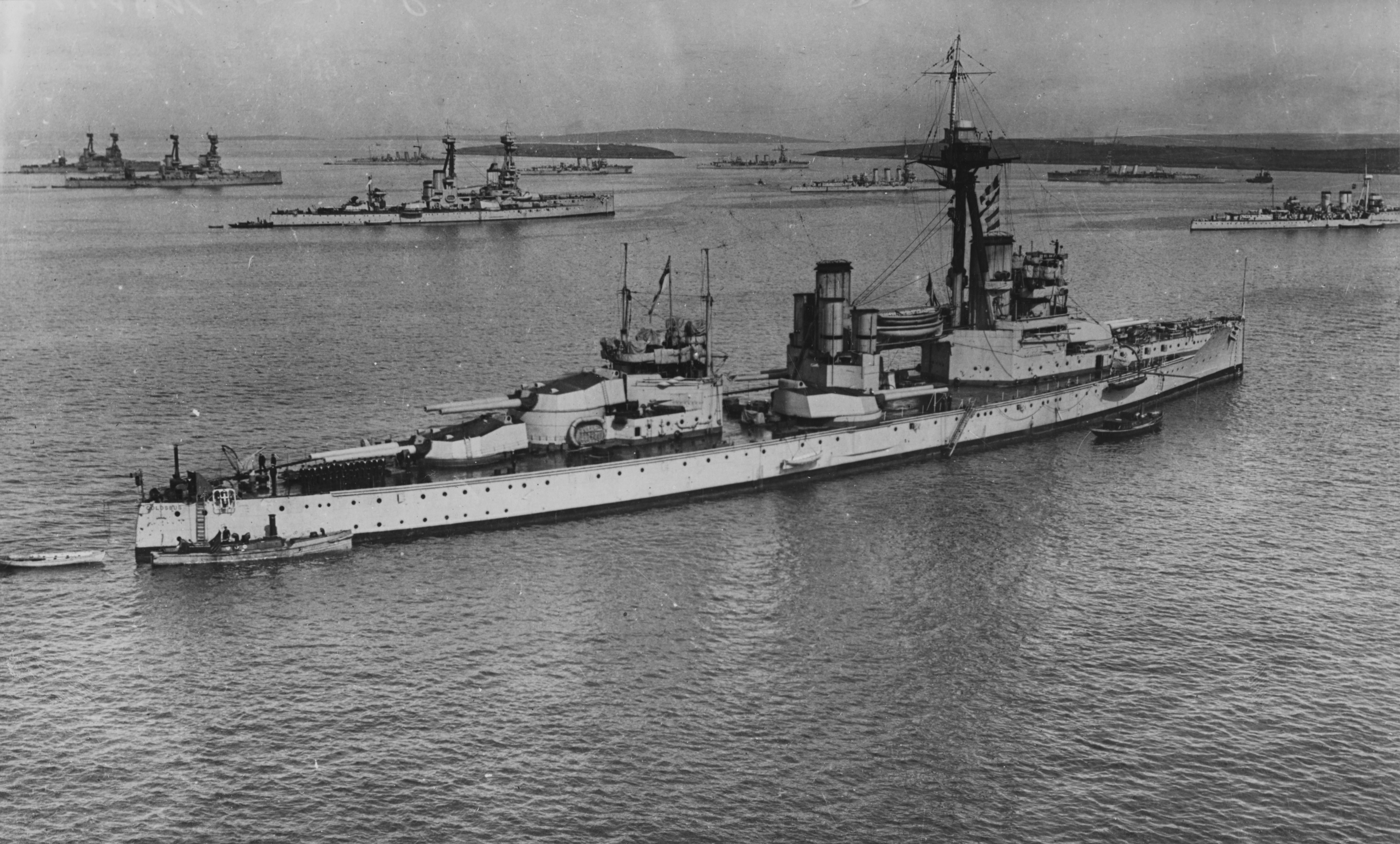
Colossus at anchor in Scapa Flow with other ships of the Grand Fleet, 1916

From June to September 1917, she was being refitted. In April 1918, the High Seas Fleet again sortied, to attack British convoys to Norway. They enforced strict wireless silence during the operation, which prevented Room 40 cryptanalysts from warning the new commander of the Grand Fleet, Admiral Beatty. The British only learned of the operation after an accident aboard the battlecruiser SMS Moltke forced her to break radio silence to inform the German commander of her condition. Beatty then ordered the Grand Fleet to sea to intercept the Germans, but he was not able to reach the High Seas Fleet before it turned back for Germany. The ship was present at Rosyth, Scotland, when the German fleet surrendered there on 21 November. In January 1919, she became flagship of the Reserve Fleet at Devonport. In March, Colossus briefly became flagship of the 3rd BS of the Home Fleet, before that role was transferred to the dreadnought Collingwood on 18 March. On 30 June 1921, she was listed for disposal, but become a boys' training ship in September, and was refitted to suit her new role. The ship was stationed at Portland until May 1922 when that establishment was closed and she returned to Devonport where she was again listed for disposal. Colossus was withdrawn from the disposal list on 23 July 1923 and hulked for the use of the training establishment HMS Impregnable at Devonport. The ship was withdrawn from Impregnable in August 1927, turned over to dockyard control on 23 February 1928 and sold to Charlestown Shipbreaking Industries for scrap in August. She was resold to Metal Industries, Limited and departed Devonport for Charlestown, Fife, on the 25th. Colossus arrived on 5 September to begin demolition.

== Bibliography ==
- Brooks, John (1996). "Percy Scott and the Director". In McLean, David; Preston, Antony (eds.). Warship 1996. London: Conway Maritime Press. pp. 150–170. ISBN 0-85177-685-X.
- Brooks, John (2016). The Battle of Jutland. Cambridge Military Histories. Cambridge, UK: Cambridge University Press. ISBN 978-1-107-15014-0.
- Burt, R. A. (1986). British Battleships of World War One. Annapolis, Maryland: Naval Institute Press. ISBN 0-87021-863-8.
- Campbell, N. J. M. (1986). Jutland: An Analysis of the Fighting. Annapolis, Maryland: Naval Institute Press. ISBN 0-87021-324-5.
- Colledge, J. J.; Warlow, Ben (2006) [1969]. Ships of the Royal Navy: The Complete Record of All Fighting Ships of the Royal Navy from the 15th Century to the Present (3rd Rev ed.). London: Chatham Publishing. ISBN 978-1-86176-281-8. OCLC 67375475.
- Halpern, Paul G. (1995). A Naval History of World War I. Annapolis, Maryland: Naval Institute Press. ISBN 1-55750-352-4.
- Jellicoe, John (1919). The Grand Fleet, 1914–1916: Its Creation, Development, and Work. New York: George H. Doran Company. OCLC 13614571.
- Massie, Robert K. (2003). Castles of Steel: Britain, Germany, and the Winning of the Great War at Sea. New York: Random House. ISBN 0-679-45671-6.
- Parkes, Oscar (1990) [1966]. British Battleships, Warrior 1860 to Vanguard 1950: A History of Design, Construction, and Armament (New & rev. ed.). Annapolis, Maryland: Naval Institute Press. ISBN 1-55750-075-4.
- Preston, Antony (1985). "Great Britain and Empire Forces". In Gray, Randal (ed.). Conway's All the World's Fighting Ships 1906–1921. Annapolis, Maryland: Naval Institute Press. pp. 1–104. ISBN 0-85177-245-5.
- Silverstone, Paul H. (1984). Directory of the World's Capital Ships. New York: Hippocrene Books. ISBN 0-88254-979-0.
- Tarrant, V. E. (1999) [1995]. Jutland: The German Perspective: A New View of the Great Battle, 31 May 1916. London: Brockhampton Press. ISBN 1-86019-917-8.
