= HMS Hercules (1910) =

1910 Colossus-class battleship of the Royal Navy

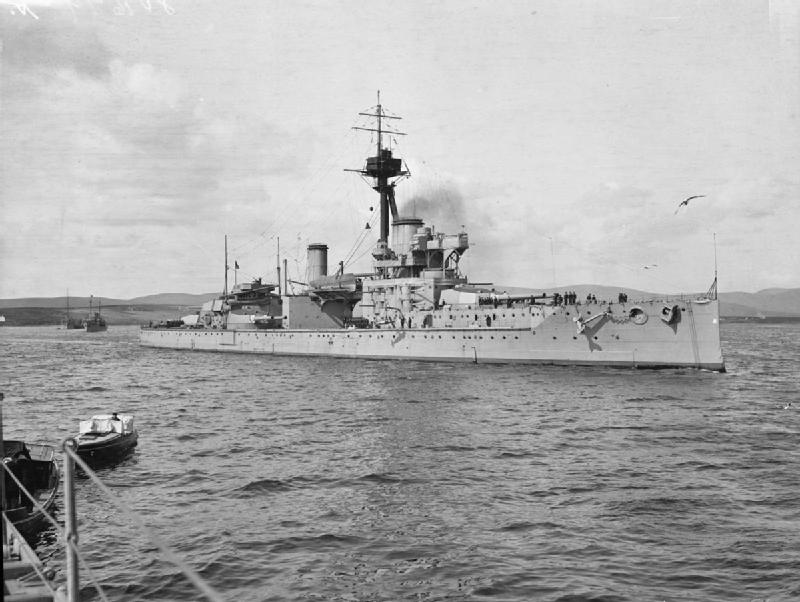
- Hercules at anchor in Scapa Flow, circa 1916–1917

History

United Kingdom
- Name: Hercules
- Namesake: Mythic demigod Hercules
- Ordered: 1 June 1909
- Builder: Palmers, Jarrow
- Laid down: 30 July 1909
- Launched: 10 May 1910
- Commissioned: 31 July 1911
- Out of service: October 1921
- Fate: Sold for scrap, 8 November 1921

General characteristics
- Class & type: Colossus-class dreadnought battleship
- Displacement: 20,030 long tons (20,350 t) (normal)
- Length: 545 ft 9 in (166.3 m) (o/a)
- Beam: 85 ft 2 in (26.0 m)
- Draught: 27 ft (8.2 m)
- Installed power: 25,000 shp (19,000 kW); 18 × Yarrow boilers
- Propulsion: 4 × shafts; 2 × steam turbine sets
- Speed: 21 knots (39 km/h; 24 mph)
- Range: 6,680 nmi (12,370 km; 7,690 mi) at 10 knots (19 km/h; 12 mph)
- Complement: 778–791 (1916)
- Armament: 5 × twin 12-inch (305 mm) guns; 16 × single 4-inch (102 mm) guns; 3 × 21-inch (533 mm) torpedo tubes
- Armour: Belt: 8–11 in (203–279 mm); Deck: 1.5–4 inches (38–102 mm); Turrets: 11 in (280 mm); Barbettes: 4–11 inches (102–279 mm); Bulkheads: 4 and 8 in (102 and 203 mm); Conning tower: 11 in (280 mm)

HMS Hercules was the second and last of the two Colossus-class dreadnought battleships built for the Royal Navy at the end of the first decade of the 20th century. She spent her whole career assigned to the Home and Grand Fleets, often serving as a flagship. Aside from participating in the Battle of Jutland in May 1916 and the inconclusive action of 19 August, her service during World War I generally consisted of routine patrols and training in the North Sea. The ship was deemed obsolete after the war and was reduced to reserve. Hercules was sold for scrap in 1921 and broken up the following year.

== Design and description ==
The design of the Colossus class was derived from that of the earlier HMS Neptune with redistributed armour and more powerful torpedoes. Hercules had an overall length of 545 feet 9 inches (166.3 m), a beam of 85 feet 2 inches (26.0 m), and a normal draught of 27 feet (8.2 m). She displaced 20,030 long tons (20,350 t) at normal load and 23,266 long tons (23,639 t) at deep load. In 1911 her crew numbered 778 officers and ratings and 791 in July 1916.

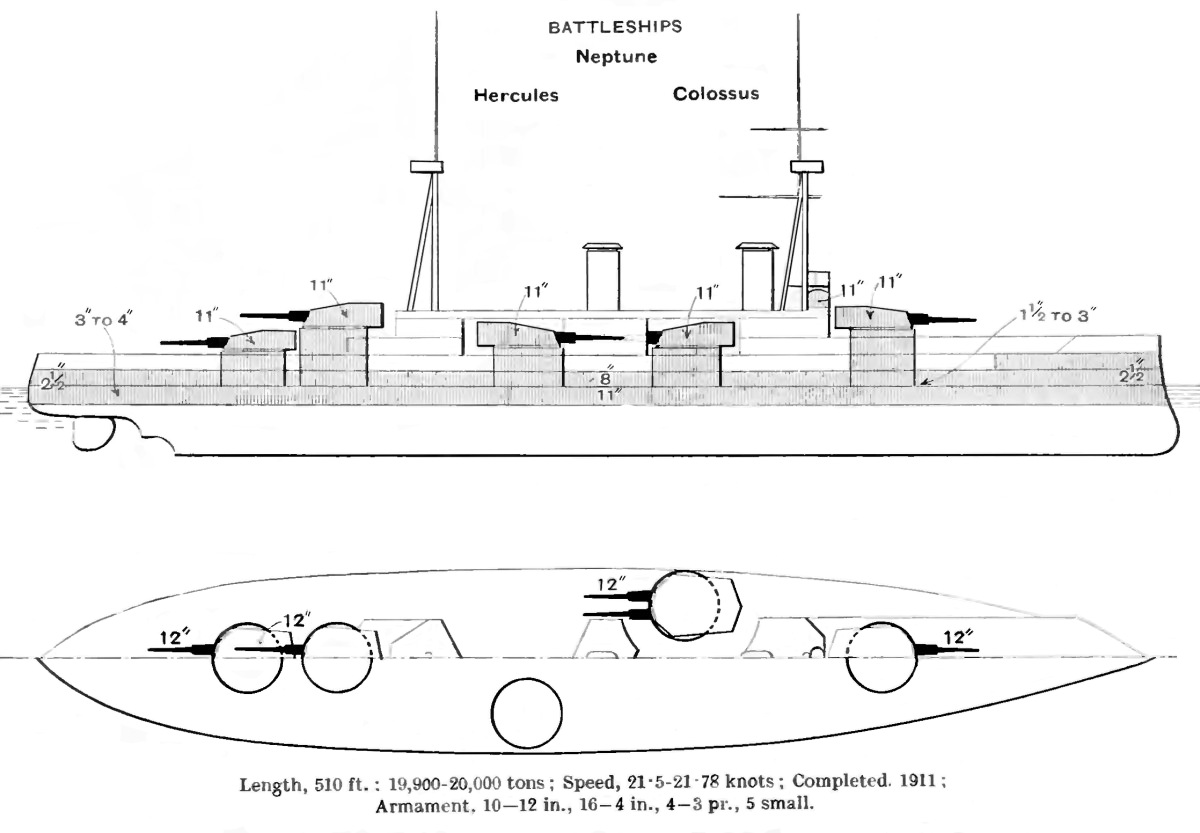
Right elevation and plan from Brassey's Naval Annual 1915. This diagram shows masts for HMS Neptune as the Colossus class had only a foremast, positioned behind the forward funnel.

Hercules was powered by two sets of Parsons direct-drive steam turbines, each driving two shafts, using steam from eighteen Yarrow boilers. The turbines were rated at 25,000 shp (19,000 kW) and were intended to give the ship a maximum speed of 21 knots (39 km/h; 24 mph). During her full-power, eight-hour sea trials on 2–3 March 1911, she reached a top speed of 21.6 knots (40.0 km/h; 24.9 mph) from 28,922 shp (21,567 kW) in a moderate storm. The Colossus-class ships carried enough coal and fuel oil to give them a range of 6,680 nautical miles (12,370 km; 7,690 mi) at a cruising speed of 10 knots (19 km/h; 12 mph).

=== Armament and armour ===
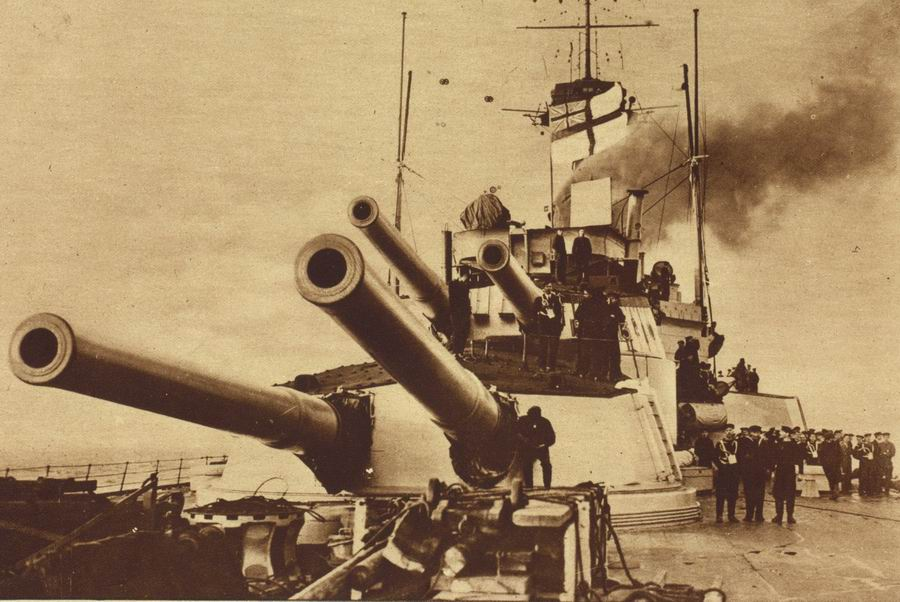
Aft turrets of Hercules

The Colossus class was equipped with ten breech-loading (BL) 12-inch (305 mm) Mark XI guns in five hydraulically powered twin-gun turrets, three along the centreline and the remaining two as wing turrets. The centreline turrets were designated 'A', 'X' and 'Y', from front to rear, and the port and starboard wing turrets were 'P' and 'Q' respectively. The wing turrets were staggered "en echelon" so all five turrets could shoot on the broadside, although in practice the blast damage to the superstructure and boats made this impractical except in an emergency. The ability to fire all ten 12" guns in broadside equaled the all centerline arrangement of the contemporary US battleships, but the centerline arrangement was less problematic to the superstructure.

The secondary armament consisted of sixteen BL 4-inch (102 mm) Mark VII guns. Ten of these were mounted in the forward superstructure and six in the aft superstructure in single mounts. Four 3-pounder (1.9 in (47 mm)) saluting guns were also carried. The ships were equipped with three 21-inch (533 mm) submerged torpedo tubes, one on each broadside and another in the stern, for which 18 torpedoes were provided.

They had a waterline belt of Krupp cemented armour that was 11 inches (279 mm) thick between the fore and aftmost barbettes that did not cover the full length of the ships. Above this was a strake of 8 inches (203 mm) armour. The forward oblique 4-inch bulkheads connected the forward barbette to the side armour. Similarly, the aft bulkhead connected them to the rearmost barbette, although it was 8 inches thick. The three centreline barbettes were protected by armour 10 inches (254 mm) thick above the main deck and thinned to 4 inches below it. The wing barbettes were similar except that they had 11 inches of armour on their outer faces. The gun turrets had 11-inch faces and sides with 3-inch (76 mm) roofs.

The three armoured decks ranged in thickness from 1.5 to 4 inches (38 to 102 mm) with the greater thicknesses outside the central armoured citadel. The front and sides of the conning tower were protected by 11-inch plates, although the rear and roof were 8 inches and 3 inches thick respectively. The torpedo control tower aft had 3-inch sides and a 2-inch roof. In an effort to reduce weight, the Colossus-class ships reverted to the inadequate underwater protection scheme of HMS Dreadnought and their anti-torpedo bulkheads only protected the shell rooms and magazines, although they had a maximum thickness of 3 inches.

==== Modifications ====
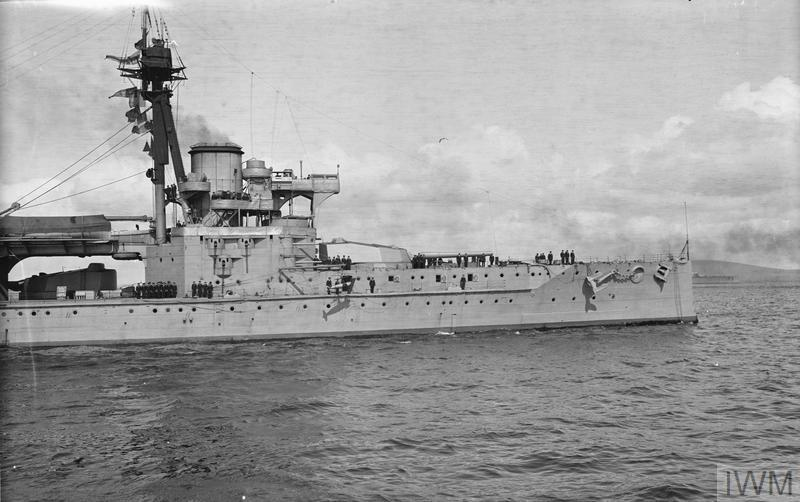
The forward part of Hercules circa 1916–1917, showing the gunnery director, the circular object just forward of the funnel atop the superstructure, and the casemates for the secondary armament

Sometime in 1912, the compass platform was extended forward to accommodate a rangefinder. In 1913–1914, a small rangefinder was added to the roof of 'X' turret and gun shields were fitted to the 4-inch guns in the forward superstructure. After the start of the war in August 1914, a pair of 3-inch anti-aircraft (AA) guns were added. A fire-control director was installed on a rear extension of the compass platform by December 1915. Approximately 50 long tons (51 t) of additional deck armour was added after the Battle of Jutland in May 1916. Around the same time, four 4-inch guns were removed from the aft superstructure. By April 1917, Hercules was equipped with single 4-inch and 3-inch AA guns and the forward group of 4-inch guns had been enclosed in casemates. The stern torpedo tube was removed in 1917–1918 and a high-angle rangefinder was fitted on the spotting top in 1918.

== Construction and career ==
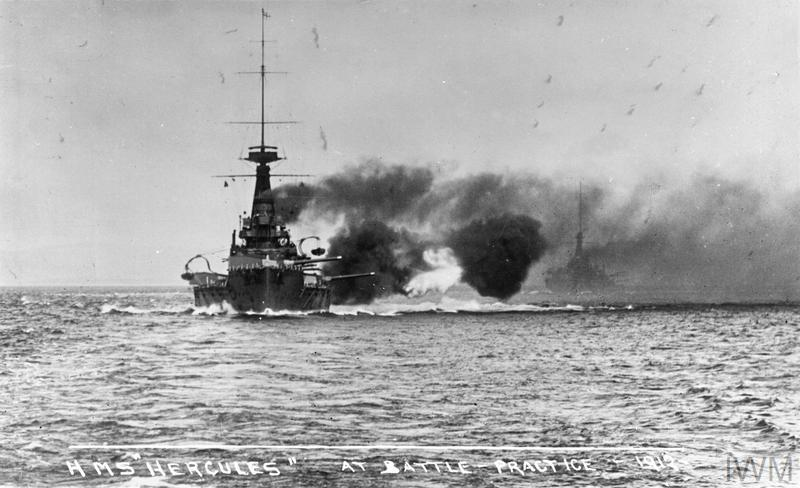
Hercules at battle practice, 1913

Hercules, named after the mythic demigod Hercules, was the fifth ship of her name to serve in the Royal Navy. The ship was ordered on 1 June 1909 and laid down at Palmers at their shipyard in Jarrow on 30 July. She was launched on 10 May 1910 and completed in August 1911 at the cost of £1,661,240, including her armament. The ship was commissioned on 4 July for trials with a partial crew. Hercules recommissioned with a full crew on 31 July and was assigned as the flagship of the 2nd Division of the Home Fleet. On 19 December Vice-Admiral Sir John Jellicoe assumed command of the division, which was renamed the 2nd Battle Squadron (BS) on 1 May 1912. The ship participated in the Parliamentary Naval Review on 9 July at Spithead and was refitted at Portsmouth in November–December. During this time, Vice-Admiral Sir George Warrender, Bt relieved Jellicoe as commander of the 2nd BS. Hercules was relieved as the squadron's flagship on 7 March 1913 and became a private ship in the squadron. On 22 March she collided with and damaged SS Mary Parkes of Glasgow in Portland Harbour during a gale, suffering only minor damage herself. In May, the ship was transferred to the 1st Battle Squadron.

=== World War I ===
Between 17 and 20 July 1914, Hercules took part in a test mobilisation and fleet review as part of the British response to the July Crisis. Arriving in Portland on 25 July, she was ordered to proceed with the rest of the Home Fleet to Scapa Flow four days later to safeguard the fleet from a possible surprise attack by the Imperial German Navy. In August 1914, following the outbreak of World War I, the Home Fleet was reorganised as the Grand Fleet, and placed under the command of Jellicoe. Most of it was briefly based (22 October to 3 November) at Lough Swilly, Ireland, while the defences at Scapa were strengthened. On the evening of 22 November 1914, the Grand Fleet conducted a fruitless sweep in the southern half of the North Sea; Hercules stood with the main body in support of Vice-Admiral David Beatty's 1st Battlecruiser Squadron. The fleet was back in port in Scapa Flow by 27 November. The 1st Battle Squadron cruised north-west of the Shetland Islands and conducted gunnery practice on 8–12 December. Four days later, the Grand Fleet sortied during the German raid on Scarborough, Hartlepool and Whitby, but failed to make contact with the High Seas Fleet. Hercules and the rest of the Grand Fleet conducted another sweep of the North Sea on 25–27 December.

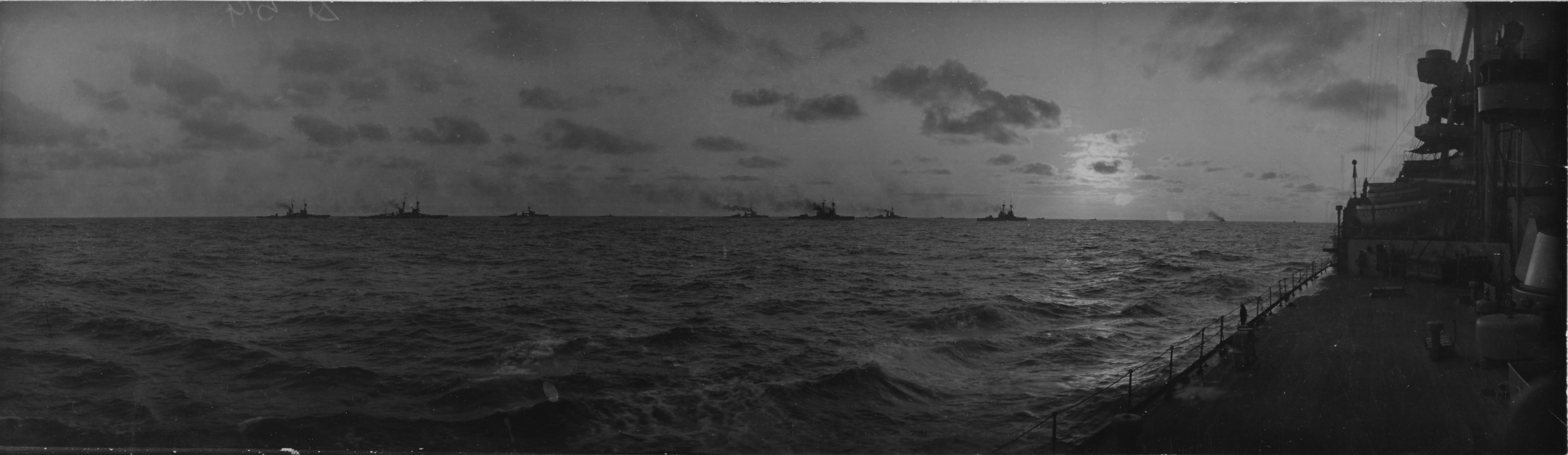
The 1st Battle Squadron at sea, April 1915

Jellicoe's ships, including Hercules, conducted gunnery drills on 10–13 January 1915 west of Orkney and Shetlands. On the evening of 23 January, the bulk of the Grand Fleet sailed in support of Beatty's battlecruisers, but Hercules and the rest of the fleet did not participate in the ensuing Battle of Dogger Bank the following day. On 7–10 March, the Grand Fleet conducted a sweep in the northern North Sea, during which it conducted training manoeuvres. Another such cruise took place on 16–19 March. On 11 April, the Grand Fleet conducted a patrol in the central North Sea and returned to port on 14 April; another patrol in the area took place on 17–19 April, followed by gunnery drills off Shetland on 20–21 April.

The Grand Fleet conducted sweeps into the central North Sea on 17–19 May and 29–31 May without encountering any German vessels. During 11–14 June, the fleet conducted gunnery practice and battle exercises west of Shetland and more training off Shetland beginning on 11 July. On 2–5 September, the fleet went on another cruise in the northern end of the North Sea and conducted gunnery drills. Throughout the rest of the month, the Grand Fleet conducted numerous training exercises. The ship, together with the majority of the Grand Fleet, conducted another sweep into the North Sea from 13 to 15 October. Almost three weeks later, Hercules participated in another fleet training operation west of Orkney during 2–5 November.

On 19 March 1916 the ship completed repairs to her turbines, which had kept her at Scapa for nearly six weeks. On the night of 25 March, Hercules and the rest of the fleet sailed from Scapa Flow to support Beatty's battlecruisers and other light forces raiding the German Zeppelin base at Tondern. By the time the Grand Fleet approached the area on 26 March, the British and German forces had already disengaged and a strong gale threatened the light craft, so the fleet was ordered to return to base. On 21 April, the Grand Fleet conducted a demonstration off Horns Reef to distract the Germans while the Imperial Russian Navy relaid its defensive minefields in the Baltic Sea. The fleet returned to Scapa Flow on 24 April and refuelled before proceeding south in response to intelligence reports that the Germans were about to launch a raid on Lowestoft, but only arrived in the area after the Germans had withdrawn. On 2–4 May, the fleet conducted another demonstration off Horns Reef to keep German attention focused on the North Sea.

==== Battle of Jutland ====
Maps showing the manoeuvres of the British (blue) and German (red) fleets on 31 May – 1 June 1916

In an attempt to lure out and destroy a portion of the Grand Fleet, the High Seas Fleet, composed of 16 dreadnoughts, 6 pre-dreadnoughts, and supporting ships, departed the Jade Bight early on the morning of 31 May. The fleet sailed in concert with Rear Admiral Franz von Hipper's five battlecruisers. The Royal Navy's Room 40 had intercepted and decrypted German radio traffic containing plans of the operation. In response the Admiralty ordered the Grand Fleet, totalling some 28 dreadnoughts and 9 battlecruisers, to sortie the night before to cut off and destroy the High Seas Fleet.

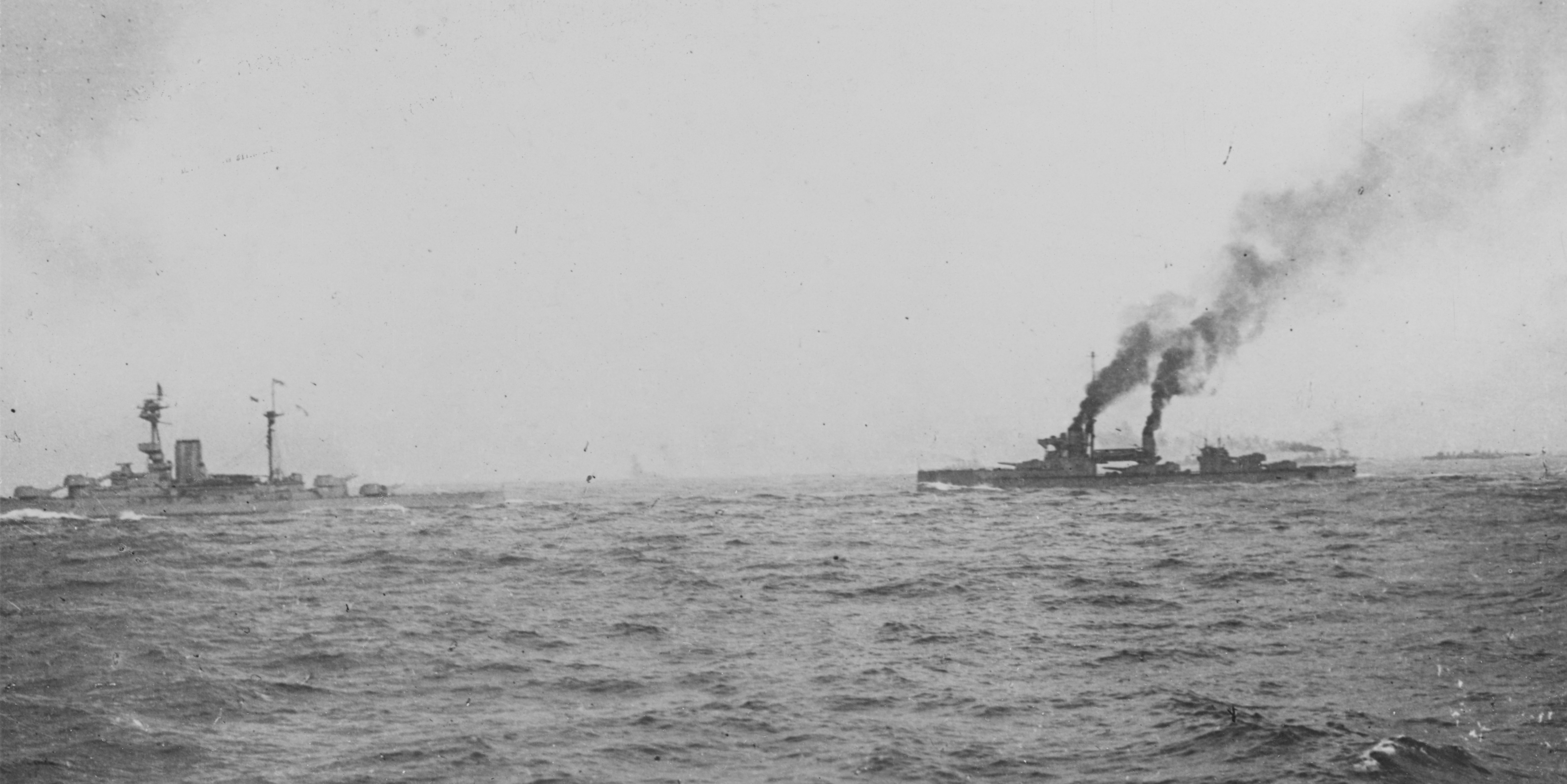
Revenge (left) and Hercules (right) en route to the Battle of Jutland, 31 May 1916

On 31 May, Hercules, now under the command of Captain Lewis Clinton-Baker, was the twenty-third ship (or second from the rear) from the head of the battle line after deployment as part of the 6th Division of the 1st BS. During the first stage of the general engagement, the ship was straddled by five shells fired by a German dreadnought at 18:16. (Note: The times used in this section are in UT, which is one hour behind CET, which is often used in German works.) Shortly afterward, she fired at the crippled light cruiser SMS Wiesbaden around 18:20. Hercules engaged a German dreadnought beginning at 18:25 with seven or eight salvos of her own. The poor visibility greatly hampered her return fire and was a problem for the entire battle. At 19:12, the ship opened fire at the battlecruiser SMS Seydlitz, and probably scored two hits. One of her high-explosive (HE) shells penetrated through the upper superstructure and caused minor splinter damage. The second HE shell burst on hitting the upper hull armour, which dished in the armour plates and caused moderate flooding. About five to ten minutes later, she engaged several German destroyer flotillas with a few salvos from her main armament without result. Hercules was then forced to turn away to avoid several torpedoes, one of which was believed to have passed very close. Marlborough, flagship of the division, was hit by a torpedo and forced to reduce speed, which caused the division to fall behind the main body of the Grand Fleet. They did not rejoin until the afternoon of 1 June, as the fleet was headed for home. Hercules received no damage and fired a total of 98 twelve-inch shells (82 HE, 4 armour-piercing, capped, and 12 common pointed, capped) and 15 shells from her four-inch guns during the battle.

==== Subsequent activity ====
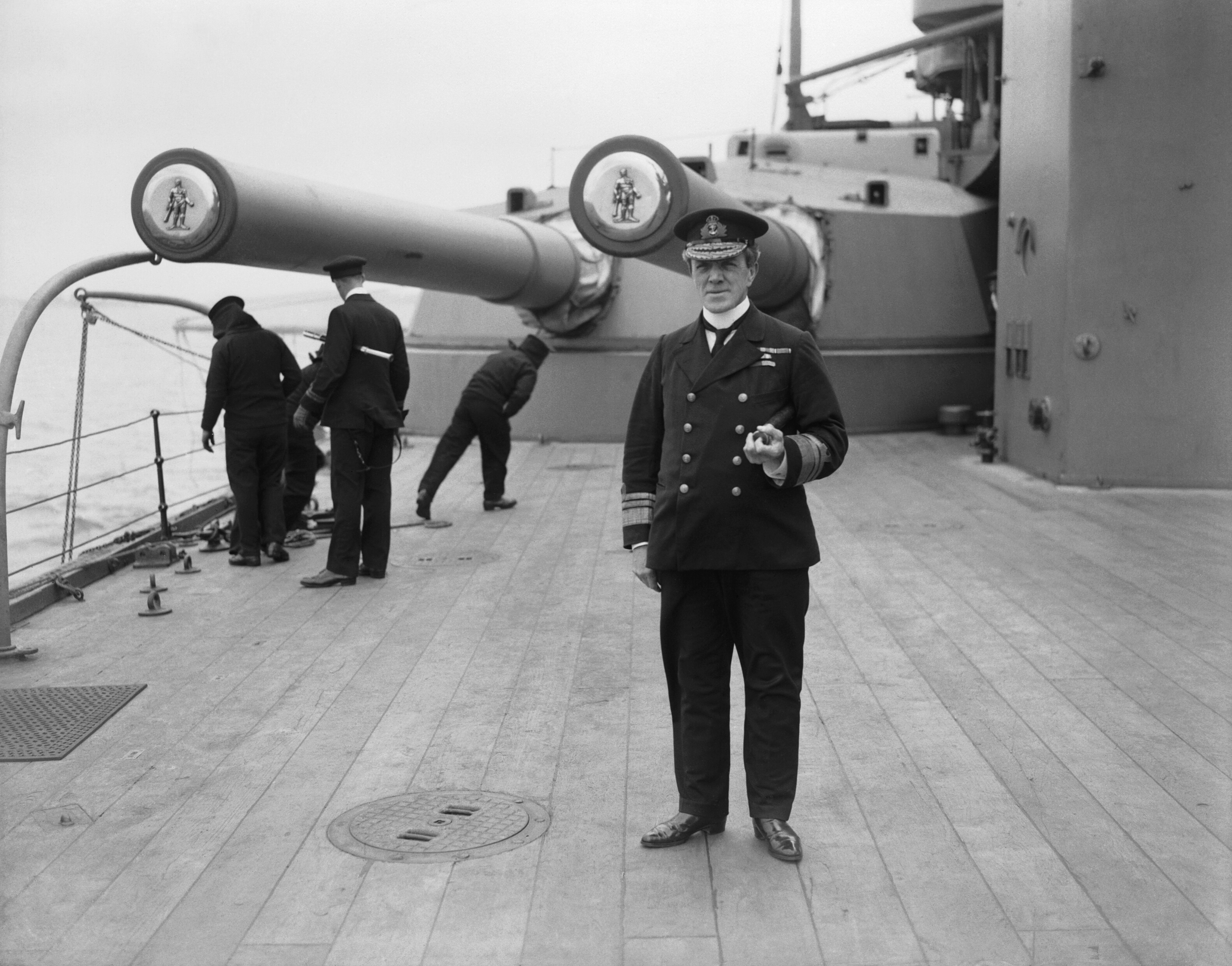
Vice-Admiral Sturdee standing in front of one of her wing turrets

After the battle, the ship was transferred to the 4th BS and became the flagship of its commander, Vice-Admiral Sir Doveton Sturdee. The Grand Fleet sortied on 18 August to ambush the High Seas Fleet while it advanced into the southern North Sea, but a series of miscommunications and mistakes prevented Jellicoe from intercepting the German fleet before it returned to port. During this foray, Hercules carried out the first test of a towed kite balloon (without observers). Two light cruisers were sunk by German U-boats during the operation, prompting Jellicoe to decide to not risk the major units of the fleet south of 55° 30' North due to the prevalence of German submarines and mines. The Admiralty concurred and stipulated that the Grand Fleet would not sortie unless the German fleet was attempting an invasion of Britain or there was a strong possibility it could be forced into an engagement under suitable conditions.

On 24 April 1918, Hercules were ordered north to Orkney to support the dreadnought Agincourt and the 2nd Cruiser Squadron when the High Seas Fleet sortied north for the last time to intercept a convoy to Norway. They enforced strict wireless silence during the operation, which prevented Room 40 cryptanalysts from warning the new commander of the Grand Fleet, Admiral Beatty. The British only learned of the operation after an accident aboard the battlecruiser SMS Moltke forced her to break radio silence to inform the German commander of her condition. The British ships were not able to reach the High Seas Fleet before it turned back for Germany. The ship was present at Rosyth, Scotland, when the German fleet surrendered on 21 November. On 3 December, she was detached to take the Allied Naval Armistice Commission to Kiel, Germany, returning to Rosyth on 20 December. Hercules was reduced to reserve in February 1919 at Rosyth and listed for disposal in October 1921. On 8 November, she was sold to the Slough Trading Co. and was resold to a German company in September 1922. The ship departed Rosyth, under tow, for Kiel in October and was subsequently broken up.

== Museum holdings ==
The National Maritime Museum's collection includes several paintings of Hercules by William Lionel Wyllie and the Imperial War Museums' collection includes a builders' model of Hercules, made by Palmers in 1910.

== Bibliography ==
- Brooks, John (1996). "Percy Scott and the Director". In McLean, David; Preston, Antony (eds.). Warship 1996. London: Conway Maritime Press. pp. 150–170. ISBN 0-85177-685-X.
- Burt, R. A. (1986). British Battleships of World War One. Annapolis, Maryland: Naval Institute Press. ISBN 0-87021-863-8.
- Campbell, N. J. M. (1986). Jutland: An Analysis of the Fighting. Annapolis, Maryland: Naval Institute Press. ISBN 0-87021-324-5.
- Colledge, J. J.; Warlow, Ben (2006) [1969]. Ships of the Royal Navy: The Complete Record of All Fighting Ships of the Royal Navy from the 15th Century to the Present (3rd Rev ed.). London: Chatham Publishing. ISBN 978-1-86176-281-8. OCLC 67375475.
- Friedman, Norman (2015). The British Battleship 1906–1946. Barnsley, UK: Seaforth Publishing. ISBN 978-1-84832-225-7.
- Halpern, Paul G. (1995). A Naval History of World War I. Annapolis, Maryland: Naval Institute Press. ISBN 1-55750-352-4.
- Jellicoe, John (1919). The Grand Fleet, 1914–1916: Its Creation, Development, and Work. New York: George H. Doran Company. OCLC 13614571.
- Massie, Robert K. (2003). Castles of Steel: Britain, Germany, and the Winning of the Great War at Sea. New York: Random House. ISBN 0-679-45671-6.
- Newbolt, Henry (1996) [1931]. Naval Operations. History of the Great War Based on Official Documents. Vol. V. Nashville, Tennessee: Battery Press. ISBN 0-89839-255-1.
- Parkes, Oscar (1990) [1966]. British Battleships, Warrior 1860 to Vanguard 1950: A History of Design, Construction, and Armament (New & rev. ed.). Annapolis, Maryland: Naval Institute Press. ISBN 1-55750-075-4.
- Preston, Antony (1985). "Great Britain and Empire Forces". In Gray, Randal (ed.). Conway's All the World's Fighting Ships 1906–1921. Annapolis, Maryland: Naval Institute Press. pp. 1–104. ISBN 0-85177-245-5.
- Silverstone, Paul H. (1984). Directory of the World's Capital Ships. New York: Hippocrene Books. ISBN 0-88254-979-0.
- Tarrant, V. E. (1999) [1995]. Jutland: The German Perspective: A New View of the Great Battle, 31 May 1916. London: Brockhampton Press. ISBN 1-86019-917-8.
