= BL 12-inch Mk XI – XII naval gun =

British naval gun

BL 12-inch Mk XI and Mk XII gun
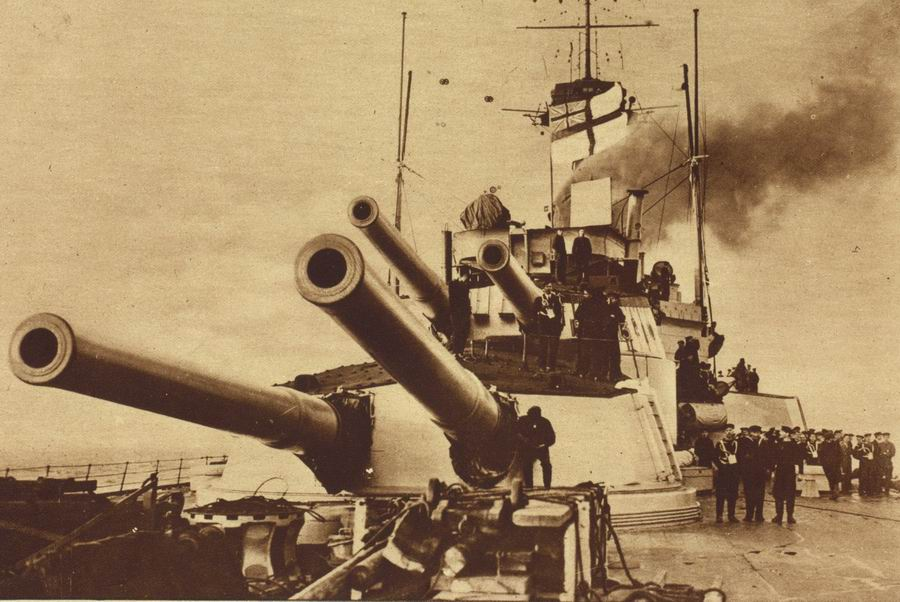
- Aft Mk XII guns of HMS Hercules
- Type: Naval gun
- Place of origin: United Kingdom

Service history
- In service: 1910–1922
- Wars: World War I

Production history
- Designer: Vickers
- Manufacturer: Vickers Armstrong Whitworth Coventry Ordnance Works William Beardmore and Company

Specifications
- Mass: 147,000 to 151,648 lbs (65.625 to 67.7 long tons or 65.7 to 68.8 tonnes)
- Barrel length: 50 ft (15.24 m) bore (50 calibers)
- Shell: 850 lb (385.6 kg) Lyddite, Armour-piercing, Shrapnel
- Calibre: 12 inches (304.8 mm)
- Muzzle velocity: 2,825 ft/s (861 m/s)
- Maximum firing range: 19,380 m (21,190 yd)

The BL 12-inch Mark XI and Mark XII gun (Note: Britain used Roman numerals to denote Marks (models) of ordnance until after World War II. These were the eleventh and twelfth models of BL 12-inch guns.) were British breech loading (BL) naval guns of 50-calibres length mounted as primary armament on dreadnought battleships from 1910.

== History ==
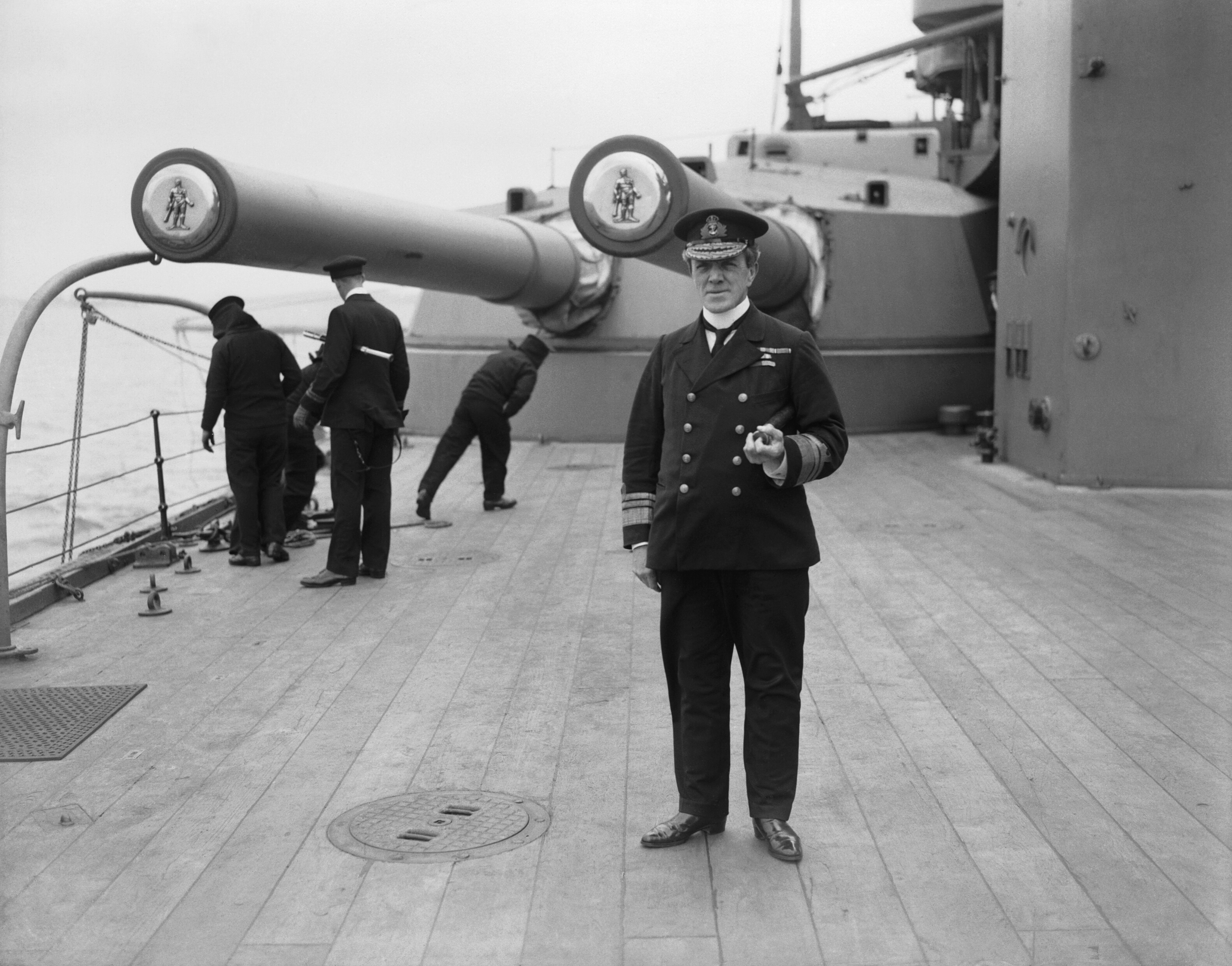
Vice-Admiral Doveton Sturdee in front of the Mk XII guns of a wing turret on HMS Hercules

In an effort to increase the armour-piercing capability and range of a 12-inch gun, the 50 calibres/600 inches Mk XI's barrel was 5 calibres/60 inches longer than the previous Mk X gun's 45 calibres. As a result, muzzle velocity increased from 2,700 feet per second (820 m/s) to 2,825 feet per second (861 m/s), but bore erosion, which led to short barrel life, and poor accuracy due to inconsistent cordite propellant burning, hampered the gun. The Mk XII derived from it suffered from the same problems.

Instead of attempting to improve their 12-inch gun, the British developed the 13.5-inch Mk V gun of 45-calibres, which could achieve greater range at lower muzzle velocities due to its larger shell.

Mk XI guns were mounted on:

- St. Vincent-class battleships laid down 1907, commissioned 1910
- HMS Neptune laid down 1909, commissioned 1911

Mk XII guns were mounted on:

- Colossus-class battleships laid down 1909, commissioned 1911

== See also ==
- List of naval guns

=== Weapons of comparable role, performance and era ===
- Obukhovskii 12"/52 Pattern 1907 gun Russian equivalent
- 30.5 cm SK L/50 gun German equivalent
- Škoda 30.5 cm /45 K10 Austro-Hungarian equivalent

== Bibliography ==
- Tony DiGiulian, British 12"/50 (30.5 cm) Marks XI, XI* and XII
