= Chao Ho =

Chao Ho may refer to:

- Chinese cruiser Zhào Hé, a protected cruiser in the Chinese fleet
- Zhào Hé class cruiser, a class of protected cruisers
