= List of dreadnought battleships of the Royal Navy =

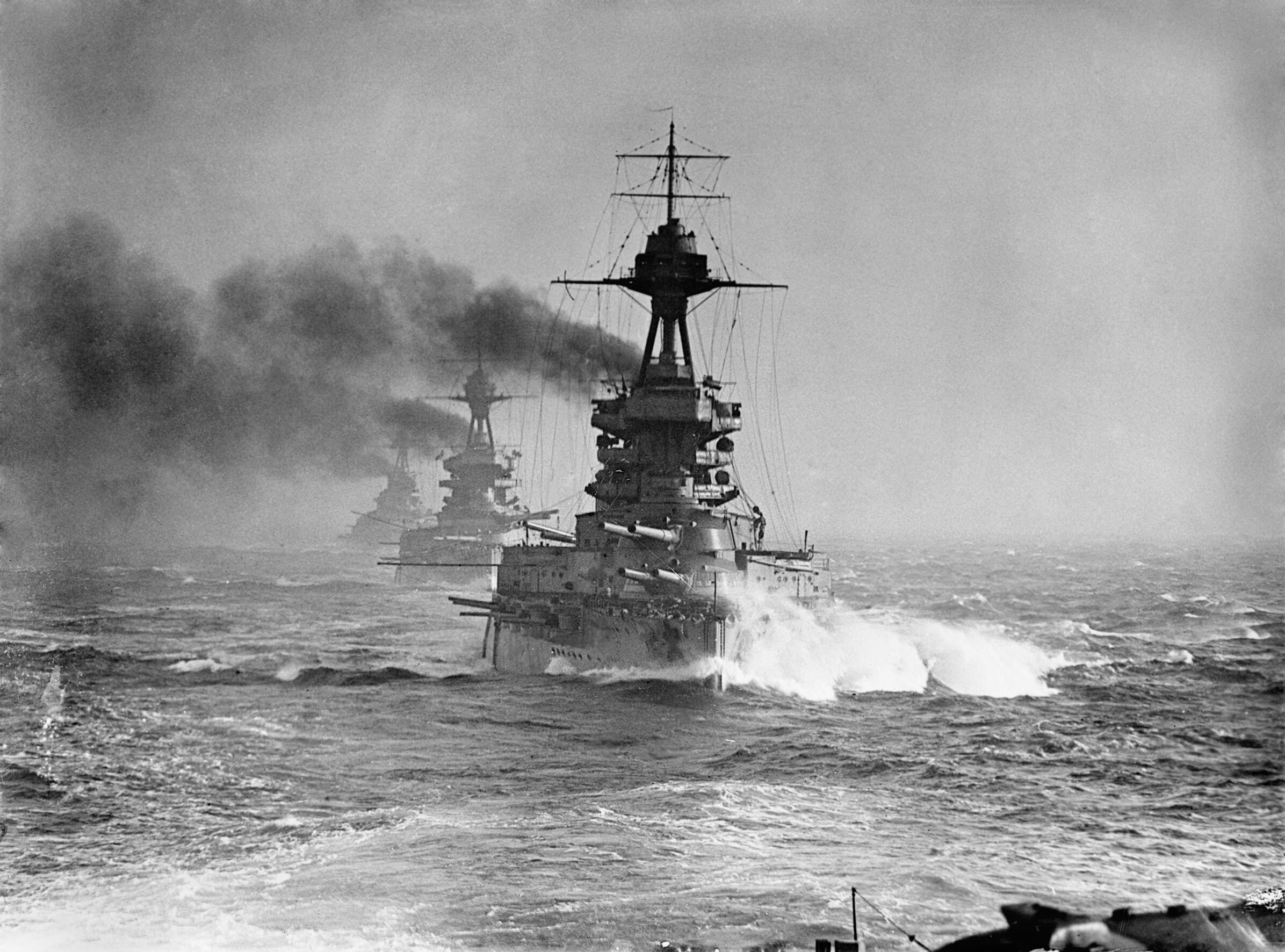
HMS Benbow leads a line of three battleships.

This is a list of dreadnought battleships of the Royal Navy of the United Kingdom.

In 1907, before the revolution in design brought about by HMS Dreadnought of 1906, the United Kingdom had 62 battleships in commission or building, a lead of 26 over France and 50 over the German Empire. The launch of Dreadnought in 1906 prompted an arms race with major strategic consequences, as countries built their own dreadnoughts. Possession of modern battleships was not only vital to naval power, but also represented a nation's standing in the world. Germany, France, the Russian Empire, Japan, Italy, Austria-Hungary, and the United States all began dreadnought programmes; second-rank powers including the Ottoman Empire, Argentina, Brazil, and Chile commissioned dreadnoughts to be built in British and American shipyards.

The Royal Navy at the start of the First World War was the largest navy in the world due, in the most part, to the Naval Defence Act 1889 formalising the adoption of the "two-power standard" which called for the navy to maintain a number of battleships at least equal to the combined strength of the next two largest navies. The majority of the Royal Navy's strength was deployed at home in the Grand Fleet, with the primary aim of drawing the German High Seas Fleet into an engagement. The capital ships of the Royal Navy and the German Imperial Navy did come into contact on occasions, notably in the Battle of Jutland, but there was no decisive naval battle where one fleet came out the victor.

The inter-war period saw the battleship subjected to strict international limitations to prevent a costly arms race breaking out. Faced with the prospect of a naval arms race against Great Britain and Japan, which would in turn have led to a possible Pacific war, the United States was keen to conclude the Washington Naval Treaty of 1922. This treaty limited the number and size of battleships that each major nation could possess, and required Britain to accept parity with the U.S. and to abandon the British alliance with Japan. The Washington treaty was followed by a series of other naval treaties to limit warship size and numbers, concluding with the Second London Naval Treaty in 1936. These treaties became effectively obsolete on 1 September 1939 at the beginning of Second World War.

The treaty limitations meant that fewer new battleships were launched from 1919–1939 than from 1905–1914. The treaties also inhibited development by putting maximum limits on the weights of ships and forced the Royal Navy into compromise designs for the Nelson and King George V classes. Designs like the projected British N3-class battleship continued the trend to larger ships with bigger guns and thicker armour, but never got off the drawing board. Those designs which were commissioned during this period were referred to as treaty battleships. After the Second World War, the Royal Navy's four surviving King George V-class ships were scrapped in 1957 and Vanguard followed in 1960. All other surviving British battleships had been sold or broken up by 1949.

== Key ==
Main guns	The number and type of the main battery guns
Armour	Waterline belt thickness
Displacement	Ship displacement at full combat load
Propulsion	Number of shafts, type of propulsion system, and top speed generated
Service	The dates work began and finished on the ship and its ultimate fate
Laid down	The date the keel began to be assembled
Commissioned	The date the ship was commissioned

== HMS Dreadnought ==
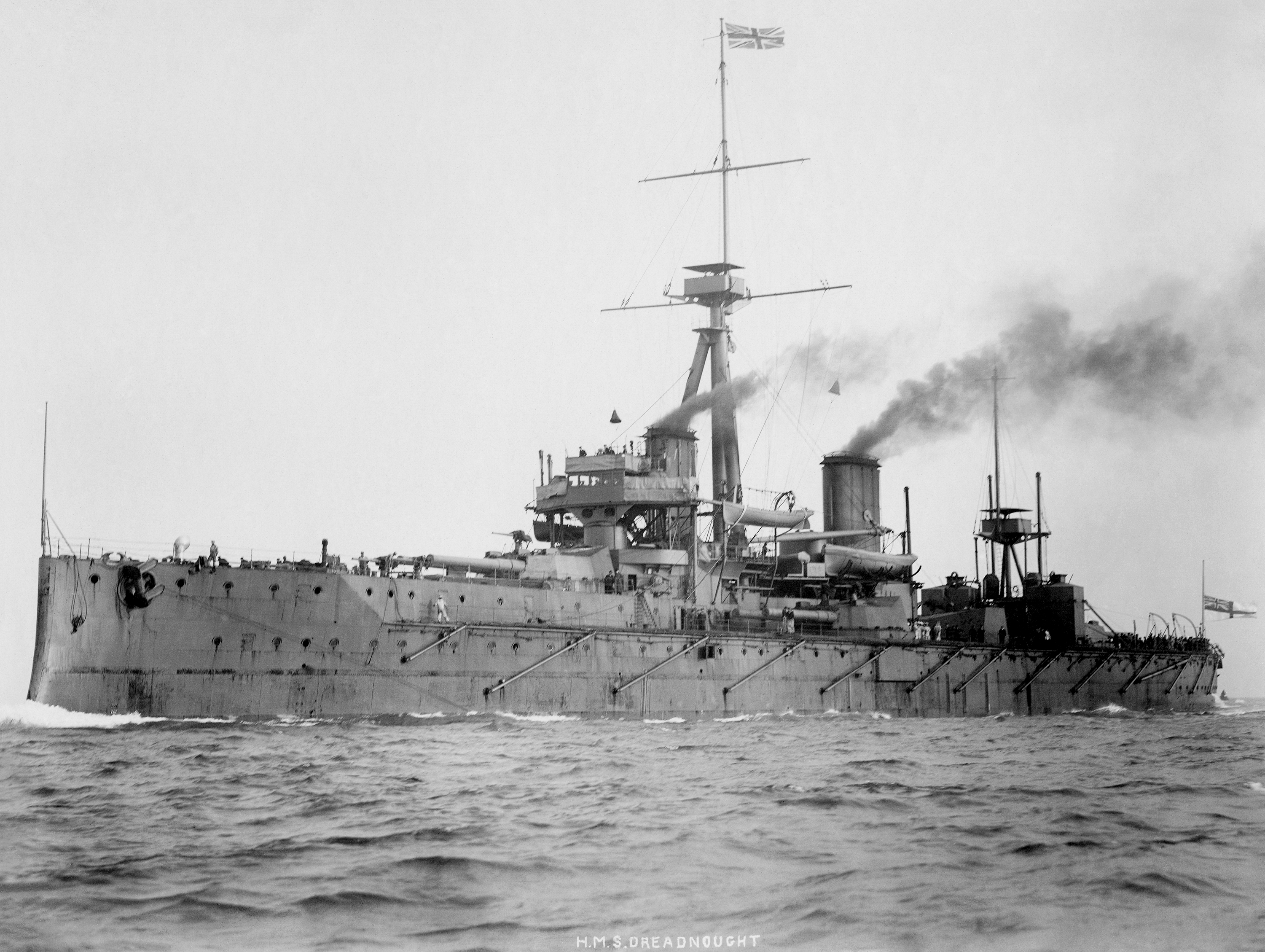
HMS Dreadnought

HMS Dreadnought was the first dreadnought battleship, a classification to which she gave her name, and was born out of the minds of Vittorio Cuniberti and First Sea Lord Admiral Sir John Fisher and the results of the Russo-Japanese War. She was the first large warship to use steam turbines, of which Dreadnought had two, from the Parsons company. They supplied four shafts that all told gave the 527-foot (161 m) long warship a revolutionary top speed of 21.6 knots (40.0 km/h; 24.9 mph) in spite of her displacement of 18,120 long tons (18,410 t). Dreadnought's primary armament was a suite of ten 45-calibre Mk X 12-inch guns, arranged in such a way that only eight of her main guns could fire a broadside, and a secondary armament of ten 50-calibre 12-pounder guns and five 18-inch (460 mm) torpedo tubes. Her belt armour ranged from 4 inches (102 mm) to 11 inches (279 mm) of Krupp armour. Dreadnought sparked a naval arms race that soon had all the world's major powers building new and bigger warships in her image. Although her concepts would be improved upon for decades, Dreadnought's construction set an unbeaten record of 15 months for the fastest construction of a battleship ever.

From 1907 until 1911, Dreadnought served as the flagship of the Home Fleet until being replaced by HMS Neptune (1909) in March 1911. Dreadnought was then assigned to the 1st Division of the Home Fleet, and was present at the Fleet Review for the coronation King George V. In December 1912, the ship was transferred from the 1st Battle Squadron and became the flagship of the 4th Squadron until 10 December 1914. While patrolling the North Sea on 18 March 1915, she rammed and sank U-29, becoming the only battleship to have sunk a submarine. (Note: USS New York may have sunk a submarine in October 1918, when she accidentally collided with what was suspected to be a submerged U-boat but this was never confirmed.) Dreadnought did not participate in the Battle of Jutland as she was undergoing a refit. Two years later, she resumed her role as flagship of the 4th Squadron, but was moved into the reserve in February 1920 and sold for scrap on 9 May 1921. She was broken up 2 January 1923.

Ship	Main guns	Armour	Displacement	Propulsion	Service		
Ship	Main guns	Armour	Displacement	Propulsion	Laid down	Commissioned	Fate
HMS Dreadnought	10 × 12 in (305 mm)	4–11 in (102–279 mm)	18,120 long tons (18,410 t)	4 × shafts 2 x Parsons turbines 21.6 kn (40.0 km/h; 24.9 mph)	2 October 1905	2 December 1906	Sold for scrap 9 May 1921

== Bellerophon class ==
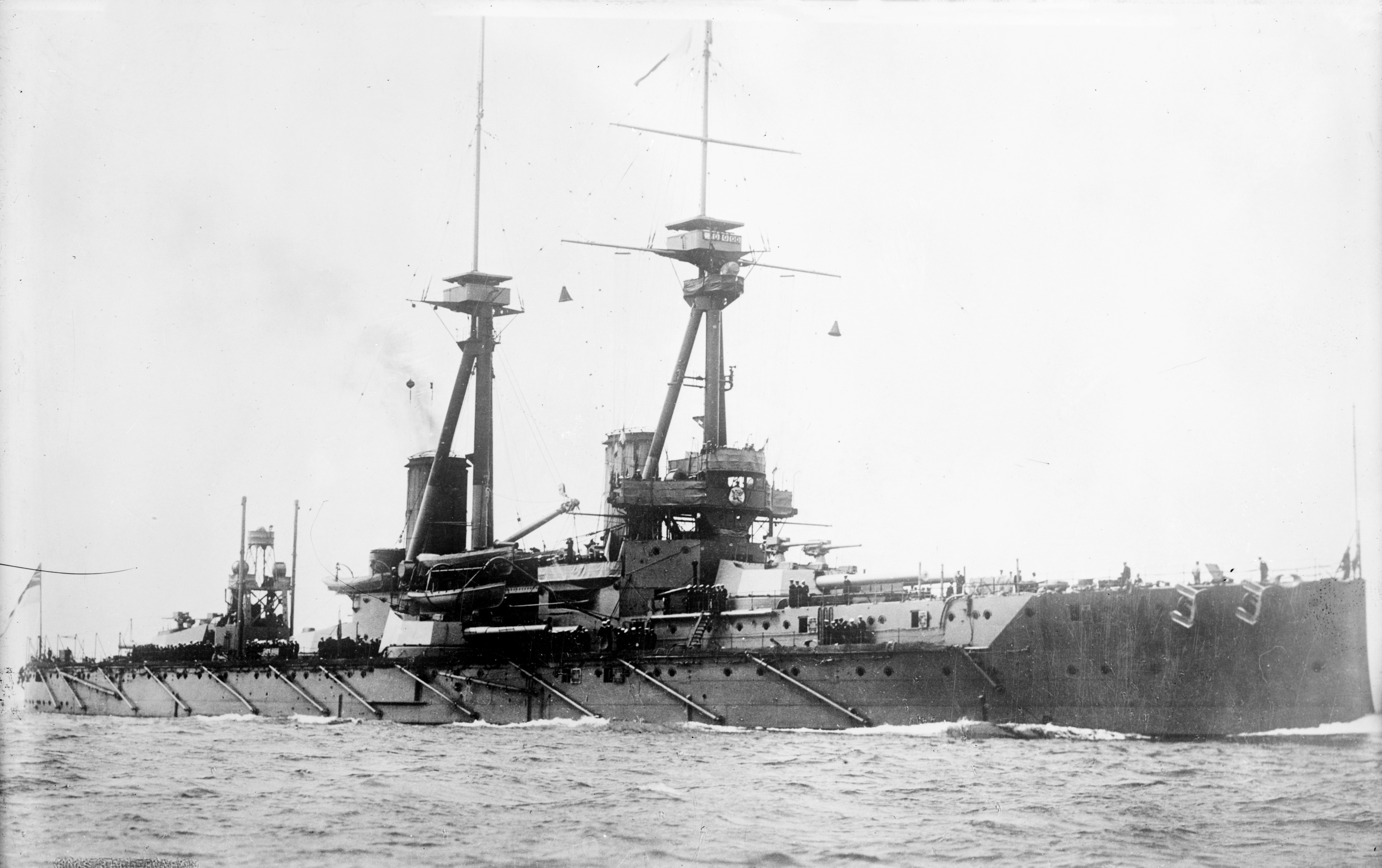
HMS Bellerophon

The Bellerophon-class battleships, HMS Bellerophon, HMS Superb, and HMS Temeraire, were the first Royal Navy dreadnoughts to be built after Dreadnought, from 1906–1909. The sisters retained much of HMS Dreadnought's design, such as her 45-calibre Mk X 12-inch (304.8 mm) guns and their arrangement, but had changes like the relocation of the foremast behind the forward funnel and an improved secondary armament. The Bellerophon sisters were 526-foot (160 m) long and displaced 18,596 long tons (18,894 t) and retained Dreadnought's means of propulsion, two steam turbines powering four shafts, and her speed of 21 knots (39 km/h; 24 mph). The thickness of the Bellerophon's belt armour, 10 inches (254 mm) at its thickest, was an inch thinner than that of Dreadnought's at her thickest.

Upon commissioning, all three ships were assigned to the 1st division of the Home Fleet, later the 1st Battle Squadron, and took part in the Coronation Review for King George V. From 17–20 July 1914, all three took part in the mobilisation and review of the Royal Navy during the July Crisis following the assassination of Archduke Ferdinand. Bellerophon and Superb joined the Home Fleet but Temeraire did not until 1915. All three ships participated in the Battle of Jutland, firing no more than 62 shells at the cruiser SMS Wiesbaden and the battle cruiser SMS Derfflinger, but without success. Later, Bellerophon served as the junior flagship of the 4th Squadron from June to September 1917 while its usual flagship (HMS Colossus) was being refitted. Superb and Temeraire were transferred to the Mediterranean Fleet, where Superb served as fleet flagship until the armistice. After the war, the now obsolete ships were placed in reserve. Temeraire became a training vessel until decommissioned and scrapped in 1921, Bellerophon was made a gunnery ship in March 1919 at The Nore and was sold for scrap 8 November 1921 and broken up 14 September 1922, and Superb relieved Bellerophon as a gunnery training vessel and then served briefly as a target ship before sold for scrapping in December 1923.

Ship	Main guns	Armour	Displacement	Propulsion	Service		
Ship	Main guns	Armour	Displacement	Propulsion	Laid down	Commissioned	Fate
HMS Bellerophon	10 × 12 in (305 mm)	8–10 in (203–254 mm)	18,596 long tons (18,890 t)	4 × shafts 2 x Parsons turbines 21 kn (39 km/h; 24 mph)	3 December 1906	27 February 1909	Sold for scrap 8 November 1921
HMS Superb	10 × 12 in (305 mm)	8–10 in (203–254 mm)	18,596 long tons (18,890 t)	4 × shafts 2 x Parsons turbines 21 kn (39 km/h; 24 mph)	6 February 1907	29 May 1909	Sold for scrap 12 December 1923
HMS Temeraire	10 × 12 in (305 mm)	8–10 in (203–254 mm)	18,596 long tons (18,890 t)	4 × shafts 2 x Parsons turbines 21 kn (39 km/h; 24 mph)	1 January 1907	15 May 1909	Sold for scrap 7 December 1921

== St Vincent class ==
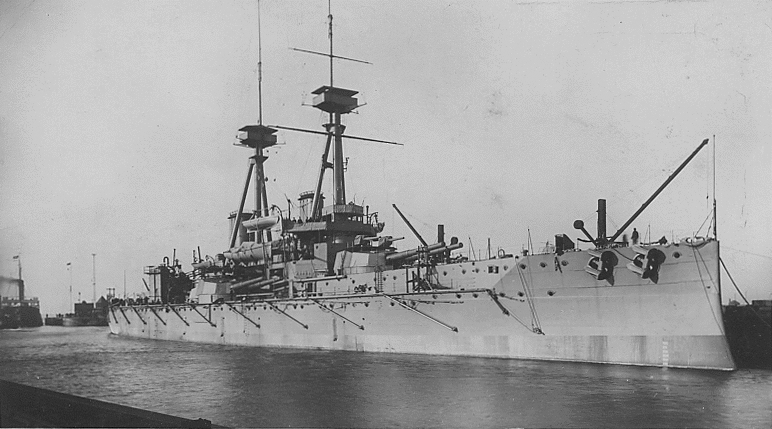
HMS Vanguard

The St Vincent-class was a line of three, originally four, (Note: The fourth St Vincent-class ship would become HMS Neptune.) dreadnought battleships, HMS St Vincent, HMS Collingwood, and HMS Vanguard. With the exception of their more powerful 50-calibre Mk XI (305 mm) main guns and twenty 50-calibre Mk VII (102 mm) secondaries, the St Vincent class closely followed the design of the Bellerophon class. Two sets of Parsons steam turbines and the four shafts they powered gave the 536-foot (163 m) long sisters a top speed of 21.7 knots (40.2 km/h; 25.0 mph) despite a displacement of 19,700 long tons (20,000 t). Finally, the sisters were protected by a Krupp cemented armour belt 8–10 inches (203–254 mm) thick, as was the case for the Bellerophon class.

Upon commissioning, the St Vincent-class battleships were all assigned to the 1st Battle Squadron of the Home Fleet. The ships were present at the Coronation Review of King George V on 24 June 1911 and HMS Collingwood became the flagship of the 1st Squadron two days later. After a lengthy refit in mid-1914, the sisters participated in the mobilisation and British responses to the July Crisis and joined the Home Fleet at Scapa Flow on 22 July 1914. All three sisters participated in the Battle of Jutland and fired upon SMS Wiesbaden; Collingwood and Vanguard also fired at SMS Moltke and SMS Derfflinger. The three sisters inflicted little damage, despite firing 98 shots during the battle. After the battle, Collingwood and St Vincent joined their sister Vanguard in the 4th Squadron, who had been transferred there in April 1916, and continued to serve with the Home Fleet until the end of the war. On 9 July 1917, one of Vanguard's magazines exploded, killing 840 of her crew and two Australian sailors aboard HMAS Sydney. After the war, St Vincent became a gunnery training ship March 1919, before being made the flagship of the Reserve Fleet in June. In December, she was relieved and then sold for scrap 1 December 1921. Collingwood was also assigned to the Reserve Fleet, briefly served as a training vessel, and then was also sold for scrap 12 December 1922.

Ship	Main guns	Armour	Displacement	Propulsion	Service		
Ship	Main guns	Armour	Displacement	Propulsion	Laid down	Commissioned	Fate
HMS St Vincent	10 × 12 in (305 mm)	8–10 in (203–254 mm)	19,700 long tons (20,000 t)	4 × shafts 2 x Parsons turbines 21.7 kn (40.2 km/h; 25.0 mph)	30 December 1907	3 May 1910	Sold for scrap 1 December 1921
HMS Collingwood	10 × 12 in (305 mm)	8–10 in (203–254 mm)	19,700 long tons (20,000 t)	4 × shafts 2 x Parsons turbines 21.7 kn (40.2 km/h; 25.0 mph)	3 February 1908	19 April 1910	Sold for scrap 12 December 1922
HMS Vanguard	10 × 12 in (305 mm)	8–10 in (203–254 mm)	19,700 long tons (20,000 t)	4 × shafts 2 x Parsons turbines 21.7 kn (40.2 km/h; 25.0 mph)	2 April 1908	1 March 1910	Sunk by internal explosion 9 July 1917

== HMS Neptune ==
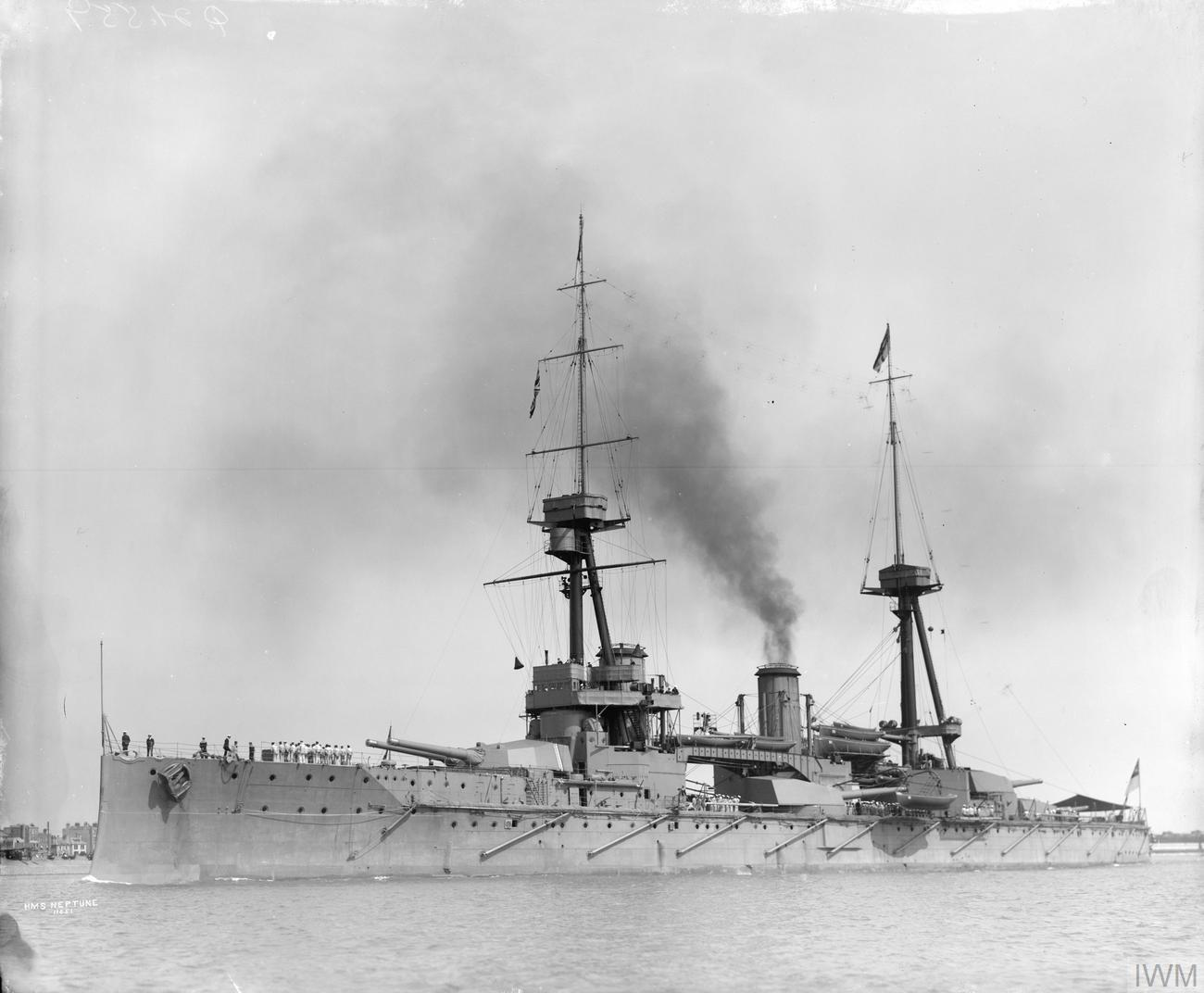
HMS Neptune

HMS Neptune, the only ship of her class, was the only battleship constructed during the 1908–1909 Naval Programme, and was the first British battleship to use superfiring gun turrets. She retained the 50-calibre Mk XI (305 mm) guns of the St Vincent class, 10-inch (250 mm) belt armour, and the top speed of 21 knots (39 km/h; 24 mph) and the two Parsons steam turbines and their four shafts that produced that speed. Neptune, however, was longer at 546 feet (166 m) and displaced 19,680 long tons (20,000 t), 20 less than the St Vincent class. Her secondary weapons also made her unique from the preceding class, as her 50-calibre Mk VII 4-inch (100 mm) secondary guns did not have shielding in the superstructure, a first for British dreadnoughts.

HMS Neptune was commissioned on 19 January 1909. She replaced HMS Dreadnought as the flagship of the Home Fleet and of the 1st Division 25 March 1909, two weeks after the completion of sea trials. Neptune then participated in the Coronation review of King George V, was replaced as the Home Fleet's flagship by HMS Iron Duke 10 March 1914, and then participated in the British naval response to the July Crisis from 17–20 July 1914. She participated in many Royal Navy actions until the Battle of Jutland, at which she fired 48 main battery shells, scoring several ineffectual or unconfirmed hits of SMS Wiesbaden and SMS Derfflinger and an assortment of German destroyers. After Jutland, she was transferred to the 4th Battle Squadron and never again saw combat. Neptune was placed in the reserve 1 February 1919 and sold for scrap in September 1922.

Ship	Main guns	Armour	Displacement	Propulsion	Service		
Ship	Main guns	Armour	Displacement	Propulsion	Laid down	Commissioned	Fate
HMS Neptune	10 × 12 in (305 mm)	8–10 in (203–254 mm)	19,680 long tons (20,000 t)	4 × shafts 2 x Parsons turbines 21 kn (39 km/h; 24 mph)	19 January 1909	11 January 1911	Sold for scrap September 1922

== Colossus class ==
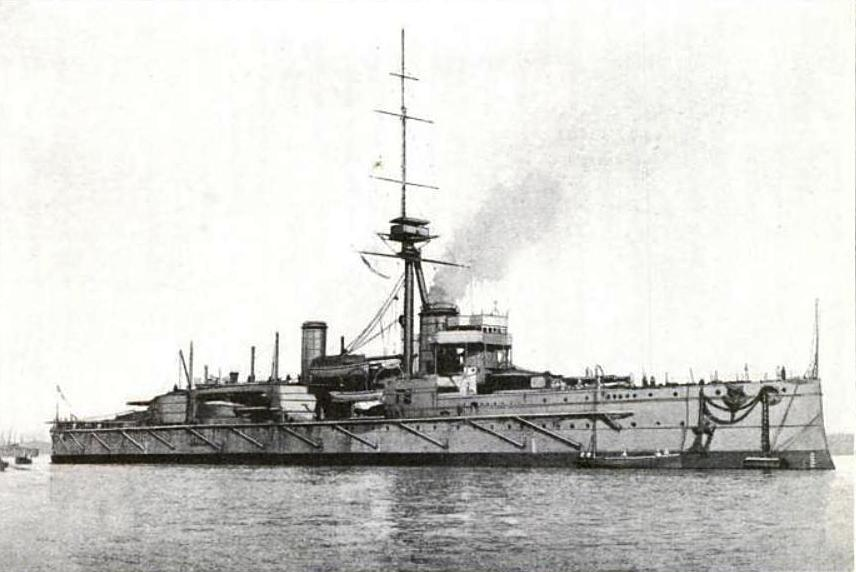
HMS Colossus

The two Colossus-class battleships were the final members of the first generation of British dreadnoughts. HMS Colossus and HMS Hercules were part of the first Naval Programme of 1909–1910 and improved upon the preceding HMS Neptune. The Colossus class retained the same two Parsons steam turbines and their four shafts and the top speed of 21 knots (39 km/h; 24 mph) they produced and the same ten 50-calibre Mk XI 12-inch (305 mm) main guns and 50-calibre Mk VII 4-inch (102 mm) secondary guns of the previous classes of British dreadnoughts. The changes were: the number of engine rooms (now three instead of two (the first ships in the world to have this many)); the length (now one foot shorter than the preceding HMS Neptune at 545 feet (166 m)); the belt armour (now one inch thicker at 11 inches (279 mm)); and the displacement (now up to 20,030 long tons (20,350 t)).

Upon commission, Colossus and Hercules were both assigned to the 2nd Division, renamed the 2nd Battle Squadron 1 May 1912, of the Home Fleet and Hercules became its flagship. Colossus was transferred to the 1st Squadron by the end of the year, and Hercules temporarily became a private ship in 1913 but later also joined the 1st Squadron. Before the First World War, Hercules had a collision with a merchant ship in Portland Harbour. After a long period of drilling and relative inactivity for the Grand Fleet, in which Colossus became the flagship of the 1st Squadron's 5th Division, both ships participated in the Battle of Jutland, firing a total of no more than 98 shells each at SMS Wiesbaden, SMS Seydlitz, and SMS Derfflinger, and were able to hit them without inflicting much damage as well as various German destroyers that neither ship managed to hit. After the battle, both ships were transferred into the 4th Squadron, Colossus becoming second-in-command, and entered another period of relative inactivity. Both ships were present at the surrender of the German fleet at Rosyth, Scotland on 21 November, and Hercules took the Allied Naval Armistice Commission to Kiel, Germany, then joined the Reserve Fleet in February 1919 a month after her sister ship had briefly become flagship. Colossus was for a time listed for scrapping, but was then made a boys' training vessel in September 1921 and was refitted. Colossus was then returned to the list the following year, but was once again removed and hulked for use by the training establishment HMS Impregnable and was finally sold for scrap in August 1928, with Hercules having preceded her on 8 November 1921.

Ship	Main guns	Armour	Displacement	Propulsion	Service		
Ship	Main guns	Armour	Displacement	Propulsion	Laid down	Commissioned	Fate
HMS Colossus	10 × 12 in (305 mm)	8–11 in (203–279 mm)	20,030 long tons (20,350 t)	4 × shafts 2 x Parsons turbines 21 kn (39 km/h; 24 mph)	8 July 1909	8 August 1911	Sold for scrap July 1928
HMS Hercules	10 × 12 in (305 mm)	8–11 in (203–279 mm)	20,030 long tons (20,350 t)	4 × shafts 2 x Parsons turbines 21 kn (39 km/h; 24 mph)	30 July 1909	31 July 1911	Sold for scrap November 1921

== Orion class ==
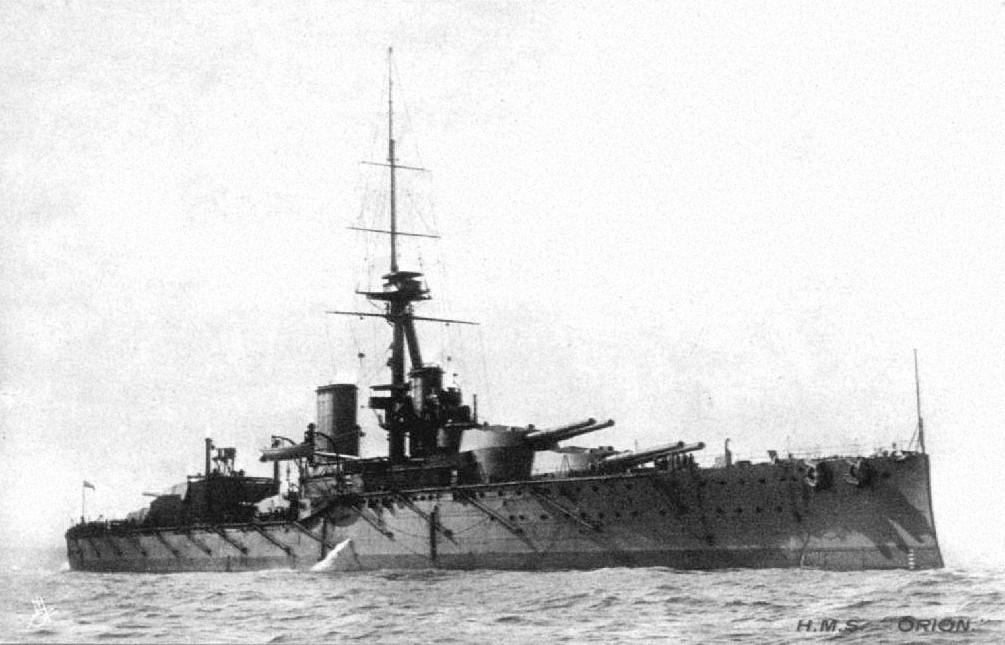
HMS Orion

The four Orion-class dreadnought battleships, HMS Orion, HMS Monarch, HMS Conqueror, and HMS Thunderer, were the first British super-dreadnoughts. The Orion class was the first to use a larger caliber main battery, with ten 45-calibre Mk V 13.5-inch (340 mm) main guns on the centreline in superfiring gun turrets, an idea taken from the American South Carolina-class battleships. The sisters were larger and more powerful than the first generation of British dreadnoughts. In addition to their bigger guns, they had Krupp armour 8–12 inches (203–305 mm) thick on the belt, were longer at 581 feet (177 m), and were heavier at a displacement of 21,900 long tons (22,300 t). However, they retained the same means of propulsion, two Parsons steam turbines powering four shafts, their top speed of 21 knots (39 km/h; 24 mph), and the 50-calibre Mk VII 4-inch (102 mm) secondary guns of the previous battleships.

All four sister ships were assigned to the 2nd Battle Squadron of the Home Fleet upon commission and Orion was named its flagship. The sisters then participated in the Fleet review at Spithead on 9 July 1914 and in the mobilisation of the Royal Navy during the July Crisis and following assembly at Scapa Flow. (Note: While Burt makes no mention of Orion's activity from January 1914 to May 1916, it is to be assumed that she participated in the activities of the 2nd Squadron.) The sisters were four of the six dreadnoughts assigned to intercept the German fleet responsible for the 16 December raid on the northeast English coast. On 27 December 1914, Conqueror rammed her sister ship Monarch as the Grand Fleet was returning to Scapa Flow, damaging both vessels. All four warships were present at the Battle of Jutland. Conqueror and Thunderer made no hits, while Monarch and Orion struck SMS König and SMS Markgraf once each and SMS Lützow five times between them; none of the four fired more than 57 of their primary shells during the entire battle. When on 21 November 1918 the German fleet surrendered at Rosyth, Scotland, the sisters were present. In February 1919, they were transferred to the 3rd Squadron and Orion retained her status as squadron flagship. By the end of 1919 the sisters were all transferred into the Reserve Fleet, but Monarch was transferred to Portsmouth in early 1920. In the summer of that year, Thunderer and Monarch were recommissioned to ferry troops to and from the Mediterranean Sea, and Orion joined Monarch at Portsmouth later in the year and became the flagship of the Reserve Fleet before being relieved in this duty by Conqueror in mid-1921 to once again ferry troops. In 1921, Thunderer and Orion were transformed into training vessels and were sold for scrap the following year in accordance with the Washington Naval Treaty. Monarch was hulked and used for weapons testing until finally sunk in 1925. Thunderer, the last of the sisters, was sold for scrap in 1926.

Ship	Main guns	Armour	Displacement	Propulsion	Service		
Ship	Main guns	Armour	Displacement	Propulsion	Laid down	Commissioned	Fate
HMS Orion	10 × 13.5 in (343 mm)	8–12 in (203–305 mm)	21,922 long tons (22,270 t)	4 × shaft 2 x Parsons turbines 21 kn (39 km/h; 24 mph)	29 November 1909	2 January 1912	Sold for scrap 19 December 1922
HMS Monarch	10 × 13.5 in (343 mm)	8–12 in (203–305 mm)	21,922 long tons (22,270 t)	4 × shaft 2 x Parsons turbines 21 kn (39 km/h; 24 mph)	1 April 1910	27 April 1912	Sunk as a target 21 January 1925
HMS Conqueror	10 × 13.5 in (343 mm)	8–12 in (203–305 mm)	21,922 long tons (22,270 t)	4 × shaft 2 x Parsons turbines 21 kn (39 km/h; 24 mph)	5 April 1910	23 November 1912	Sold for scrap 19 December 1922
HMS Thunderer	10 × 13.5 in (343 mm)	8–12 in (203–305 mm)	21,922 long tons (22,270 t)	4 × shaft 2 x Parsons turbines 21 kn (39 km/h; 24 mph)	13 April 1910	15 June 1912	Sold for scrap 6 November 1926

== King George V class (1911) ==
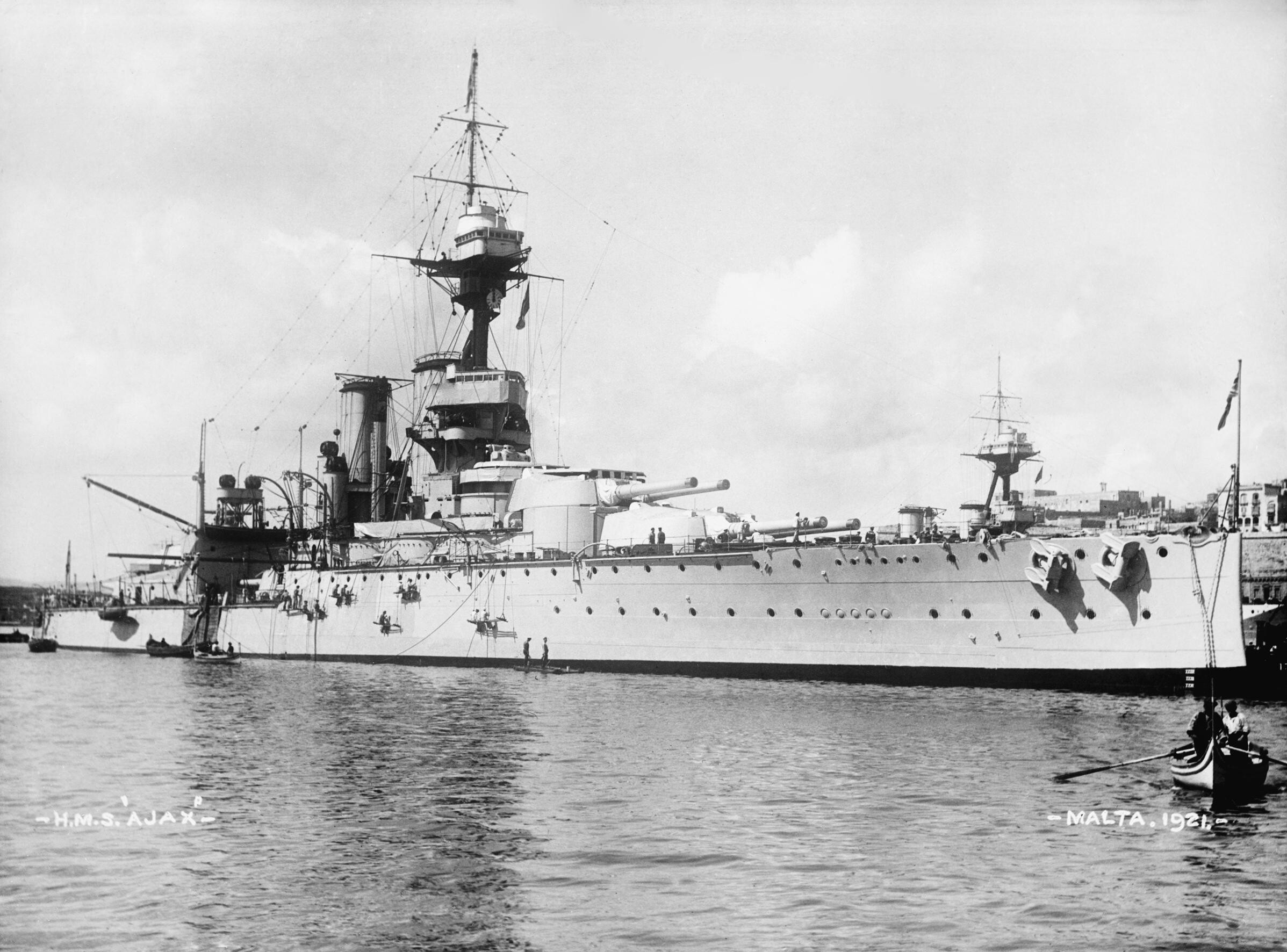
HMS Ajax

The King George V-class battleships, HMS King George V, HMS Centurion, HMS Audacious, and HMS Ajax, were larger variants of the preceding Orion-class "super-dreadnought." The four sisters used the same primary and secondary armament of the Orions, ten 45-calibre Mk V 13.5-inch (340 mm) main guns and 16 50-calibre Mk VII 4-inch (102 mm) secondary guns, and 12-inch (305 mm)-thick belt armour, but were longer at 597 feet 9 inches (182 m) and displaced 25,420 long tons (25,830 t). In addition, although the King George V class again retained the two Parsons steam turbines and their four shafts, they were faster than previous British battleships with a top speed of 22.9 kn (42.4 km/h; 26.4 mph) and enjoyed much-needed corrections in the arrangement of its funnels that made the spotting tops much easier to use.

All four of the King George V-class ships were assigned to the 2nd Battle Squadron on commission, King George V becoming the Squadron's flagship by 18 February 1913, but Centurion began her career early, accidentally ramming and sinking an Italian steamer with all hands. From 17 to 20 July 1914 the sister ships participated in the July Crisis test mobilisation and were shortly thereafter ordered to join the Home Fleet, soon the Grand Fleet, at Scapa Flow. On 27 October 1914, Audacious struck a mine while conducting a training mission off the coast of Ireland and sank with only one death, an officer from HMS Liverpool. King George V also went out of service for a brief time beginning in November 1914 because of a condenser malfunction. The surviving sisters participated in a sortie that set out to engage Franz von Hipper's raiding force after its attack on three coastal British towns in December 1914, but did not see combat. At the Battle of Jutland nearly two years later, the sisters did see combat but none of them fired more than 19 shells, all without effect due to poor visibility. The sisters participated in the Royal Navy's subsequent war time actions and were present at the surrender of the German fleet at Rosyth on 21 November 1918. Into early 1919, the sisters remained with the 2nd Squadron, until King George V was moved to the 3rd Squadron and then became the flagship of the Reserve Fleet until 1920 when the 3rd Squadron was disbanded. She was refitted and reassigned to the 4th Squadron the same year, then in 1923 became a gunnery training vessel before finally being sold for scrap in December 1926. Ajax met the same fate, but was sold for scrap on 9 November 1926. The last of the King George V-class ships, Centurion was converted into a target ship, but was remilitarised in 1941 with light weapons and dummy main guns. On 9 June 1944, she was sunk as a block ship to defend a mulberry harbor established on Omaha Beach.

Ship	Main guns	Armour	Displacement	Propulsion	Service		
Ship	Main guns	Armour	Displacement	Propulsion	Laid down	Commissioned	Fate
HMS King George V (Note: HMS King George V's name originally was to be HMS Royal George, but this was changed in 1910, before construction began.)	10 × 13.5 in (343 mm)	12 in (305 mm)	25,420 long tons (25,830 t)	4 × shaft 2 x Parsons turbines 22.9 kn (42.4 km/h; 26.4 mph)	16 January 1911	16 November 1912	Sold for scrap December 1926
HMS Centurion	10 × 13.5 in (343 mm)	12 in (305 mm)	25,420 long tons (25,830 t)	4 × shaft 2 x Parsons turbines 22.9 kn (42.4 km/h; 26.4 mph)	16 January 1911	22 May 1913	Sunk as a block ship 9 June 1944
HMS Audacious	10 × 13.5 in (343 mm)	12 in (305 mm)	25,420 long tons (25,830 t)	4 × shaft 2 x Parsons turbines 22.9 kn (42.4 km/h; 26.4 mph)	23 March 1911	15 October 1913	Sank after striking a mine 27 October 1914
HMS Ajax	10 × 13.5 in (343 mm)	12 in (305 mm)	25,420 long tons (25,830 t)	4 × shaft 2 x Parsons turbines 22.9 kn (42.4 km/h; 26.4 mph)	27 February 1911	31 October 1913	Sold for scrap 9 November 1926

== Iron Duke class ==
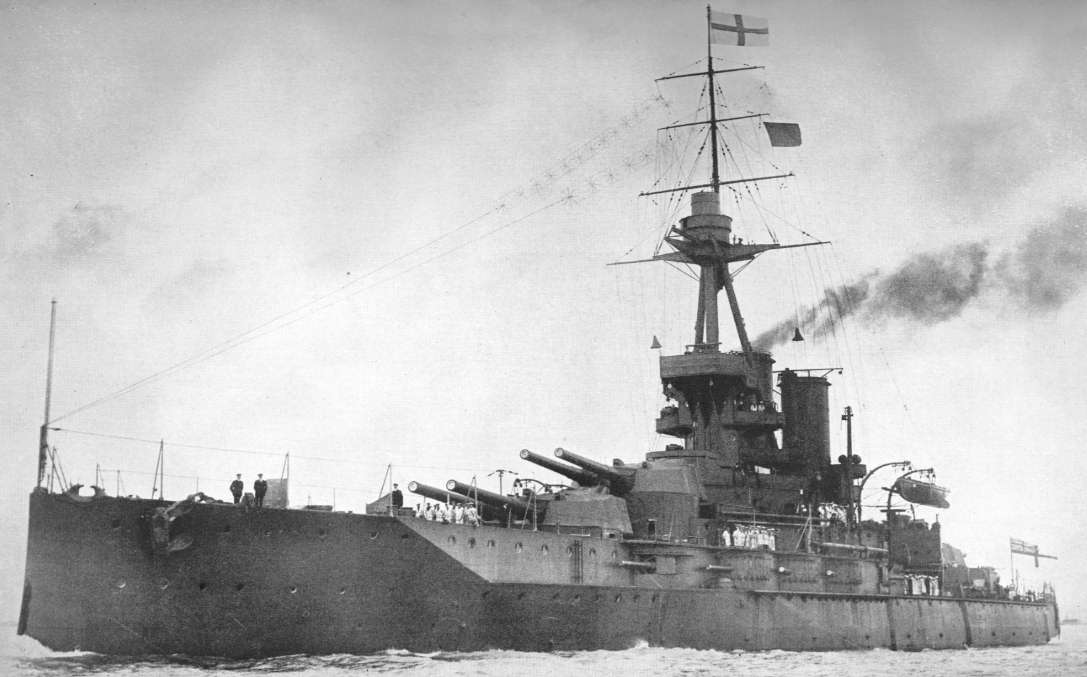
HMS Iron Duke

The four Iron Duke-class battleships, HMS Iron Duke, HMS Marlborough, HMS Benbow, and HMS Emperor of India, were the third line of British super-dreadnoughts. In design the sisters were nearly identical to the King George V class, bearing the same ten Mk V 13.5-inch (340 mm) main battery guns and 12-inch (300 mm) Krupp armour of the King George V class, but were 25 feet longer at 622 feet 9 inches (190 m) long and displaced 25,000 long tons (25,000 t). As with previous British battleships, the Iron Duke-class sisters had four shafts powered by two Parsons steam turbines for a top speed of 21.5 knots (39.8 km/h; 24.7 mph), but they possessed an improved secondary armament of twelve 45-calibre Mk VII 6-inch (150 mm) naval guns.

New for British dreadnoughts, the four Iron Duke-class sisters were fairly separated from each other in their careers. On completion, Iron Duke joined the Royal Navy's Home Fleet as its new flagship, Marlborough followed her into the Home Fleet as the flagship of Lewis Bayly. Both ships were completed within two months before the start of World War I and were soon reorganized into the Grand Fleet, of which Iron Duke remained the flagship while Marlborough was assigned to the 1st Battle Squadron as Admiral John Jellicoe's flagship. At this time, Benbow and Emperor of India were completed and assigned to the 4th Battle Squadron, the latter as the flagship of the second division and the former of the whole squadron, and the sisters all had their casemates sealed and rearmost secondary guns removed. All the sisters but Emperor of India, in dock for refits, were present for the Battle of Jutland and fought with distinction. Iron Duke, surviving a near-miss as she entered combat, opened fire on SMS König, and scored seven hits. Marlborough and Benbow struggled with poor visibility, the former firing seven salvos at a group of Kaiser-class battleships and the latter firing six salvos, both without effect. When fighting around SMS Wiesbaden resumed, all three sisters participated but without any hits on the torpedo boats around the disabled cruiser. Marlborough eventually neutralised the Wiesbaden, sustaining extensive damage in the process, and also struck SMS Grosser Kurfürst three times with thirteen salvos. After the battle, Marlborough underwent three months of repairs and received increased armour plating, and Emperor of India rejoined the Home Fleet in the 1st Battle Squadron. In March 1919, the Iron Duke-class sisters were assigned to the 4th Battle Squadron with the Mediterranean Fleet to participate in the Allied intervention in the Russian Civil War in the Black Sea, Marlborough even carrying Maria Feodorovna, Grand Duke Nicholas, and Prince Yusupov, and then the sisters served in the Greco-Turkish War until Greece's defeat in the war in 1922, at which point Marlborough, Benbow, and Emperor of India underwent refitting at different ports. Iron Duke remained in the Mediterranean and was present with HMS King George V for the Great fire of Smyrna and following Allied deliberations on Greece. Benbow relieved Iron Duke for a major refit of her own in May 1928, then was decommissioned and sold for scrap in March 1931. Marlborough and Emperor of India followed her the next year after being used as target ships, sold for scrap in February and June 1932, respectively. Iron Duke survived into World War II, serving at Scapa Flow as a floating anti-aircraft battery and was twice attacked and heavily damaged by Luftwaffe Junkers Ju 88s, and was refloated after the war and then sold for scrap in March 1946.

Ship	Main guns	Armour	Displacement	Propulsion	Service		
Ship	Main guns	Armour	Displacement	Propulsion	Laid down	Commissioned	Fate
HMS Iron Duke	10 × 13.5 in (343 mm)	12 in (305 mm)	25,000 long tons (25,400 t)	4 × shafts 2 x Parsons turbines 21.5 kn (39.8 km/h; 24.7 mph)	12 January 1912	10 March 1914	Sold for scrap March 1946
HMS Marlborough	10 × 13.5 in (343 mm)	12 in (305 mm)	25,000 long tons (25,400 t)	4 × shafts 2 x Parsons turbines 21.5 kn (39.8 km/h; 24.7 mph)	25 January 1912	2 June 1914	Sold for scrap 27 June 1932
HMS Benbow	10 × 13.5 in (343 mm)	12 in (305 mm)	25,000 long tons (25,400 t)	4 × shafts 2 x Parsons turbines 21.5 kn (39.8 km/h; 24.7 mph)	30 May 1912	7 October 1914	Sold for scrap March 1931
HMS Emperor of India	10 × 13.5 in (343 mm)	12 in (305 mm)	25,000 long tons (25,400 t)	4 × shafts 2 x Parsons turbines 21.5 kn (39.8 km/h; 24.7 mph)	31 May 1912	10 November 1914	Sold for scrap 6 February 1932

== HMS Agincourt ==
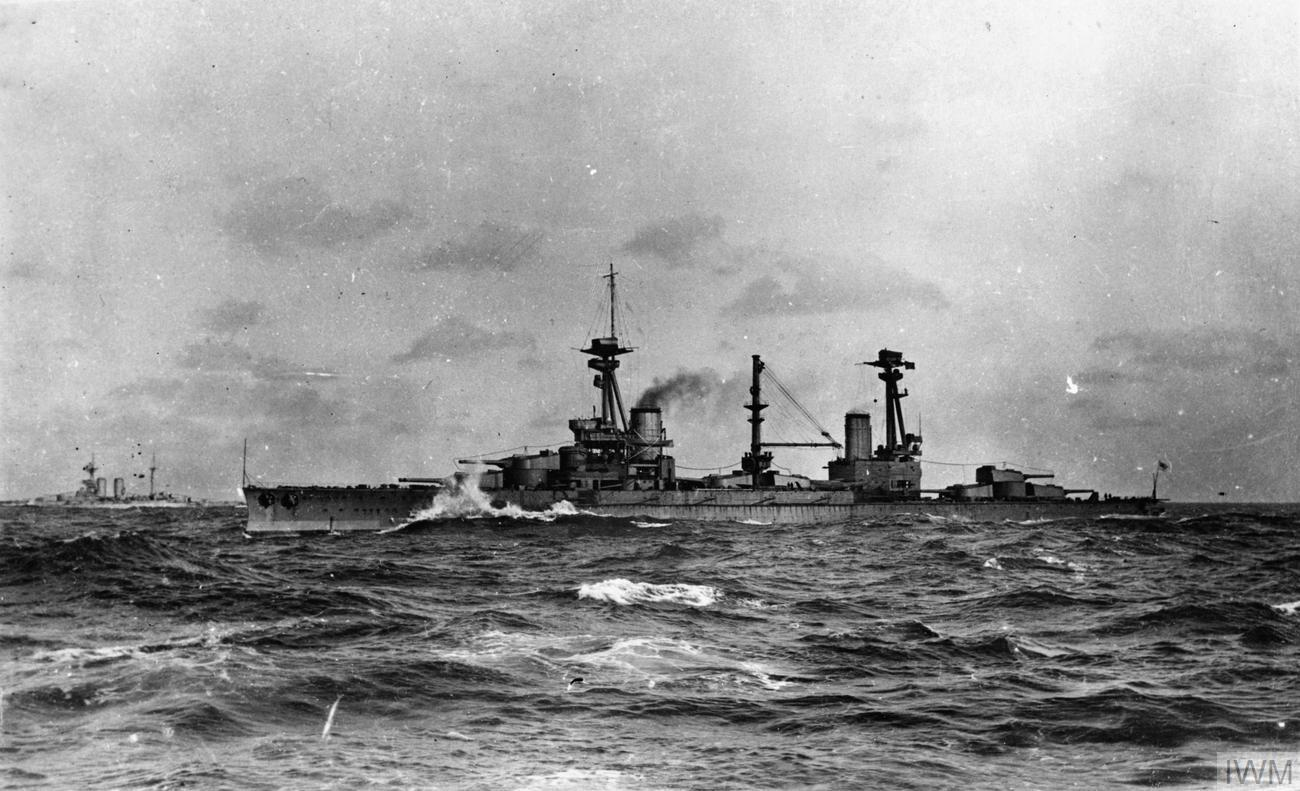
HMS Agincourt

HMS Agincourt was laid down in Newcastle upon Tyne in 1911 as the Brazilian battleship Rio de Janeiro, but was sold to the Ottoman Empire in December 1913, named Sultân Osmân-ı Evvel, and was seized by the British government and given her final name when Turkey entered the First World War for the Central Powers. Agincourt, 671 feet 6 inches (205 m) long and displacing 27,850 long tons (28,300 t), was powered by four Parsons steam turbines and shafts for a top speed of 22 knots (41 km/h; 25 mph). She was armed with fourteen 45-calibre Mk XIII 12-inch (305 mm) main guns, and eighteen 50-calibre Mk XIII 6-inch (152 mm) naval guns for its secondaries, and was protected by belt armour 9 inches (229 mm) thick.

After being commissioned into the Royal Navy on 7 August 1914, Agincourt joined the Grand Fleet's 4th Battle Squadron on 7 September 1914 but was reassigned to the 1st Battle Squadron on 31 May 1916, just in time for the Battle of Jutland. She engaged a German battlecruiser and destroyers and a Kaiser-class battleship with her main and secondary guns, firing a total of 144 of her main battery shells and secondary shells, but is not known to have hit any enemy ship. Agincourt's participation in the Royal Navy's sorties after Jutland is not well explored, but she did sortie once with HMS Hercules from Scapa Flow to protect merchant convoys from Norway to the United Kingdom on 23 April 1918. After being transferred to the 2nd Battle Squadron, Agincourt was present for the surrender of the High Seas Fleet and was then placed in reserve in March 1919. The Brazilian government was not interested in purchasing her, so Agincourt was listed for disposal and then sold for scrap on 19 December 1922 in accordance with the Washington Naval Treaty.

Ship	Main guns	Armour	Displacement	Propulsion	Service		
Ship	Main guns	Armour	Displacement	Propulsion	Laid down	Commissioned	Fate
HMS Agincourt	14 × 12 in (305 mm)	9 in (229 mm)	27,850 long tons (28,300 t)	4 × shafts 4 x Parsons turbines 22 kn (41 km/h; 25 mph)	14 September 1911	7 August 1914	Sold for scrap December 1922

== HMS Erin ==
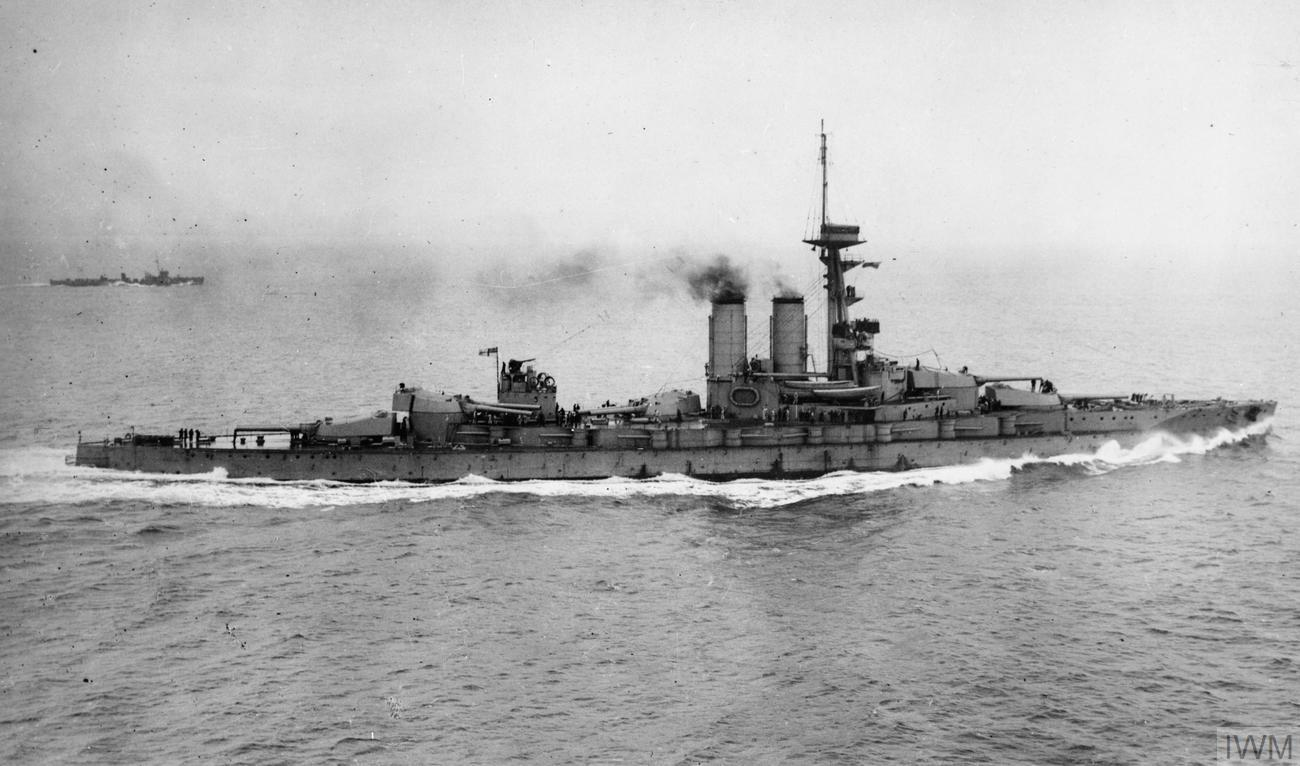
HMS Erin

HMS Erin, originally the Turkish battleship Reşadiye, was one of two battleships being built for the Ottoman Empire (the other being HMS Agincourt) and was derived from the King George V class. She had Krupp 12-inch (300 mm) armour belt and was equipped with ten 45-calibre Mk VI 13.5-inch (340 mm) guns, similar to the King George V class's main guns, but had the Orion class's sixteen 50-calibre Mk XVI 6-inch (150 mm) secondary guns. She was shorter in length at 559 feet 6 inches (171 m) and displaced 22,780 long tons (23,150 t). Unlike either the Orion or King George V-class battleships, Erin had four Parsons steam turbines driving four shafts for a top speed of 21 knots (39 km/h; 24 mph).

On 29 July 1914, Reşadiye was seized under the orders of First Lord of the Admiralty Winston Churchill, and on the 31st it entered the Royal Navy as HMS Erin. She joined the Grand Fleet's 4th Battle Squadron on 5 September of the same year and participated in the fleet's early war sorties and drills, most importantly in response to the German attack on Scarborough, Hartlepool and Whitby. At some point from September to December 1915, Erin was transferred to the 2nd Battle Squadron. She participated in the Battle of Jutland, but was hindered by poor visibility and was the only British capital ship to not fire her main battery guns and only fired six 6-inch shells. After Jutland, Erin returned to active participation in the Grand Fleet's North Sea operations, sortieing against High Seas Fleet raids on merchant convoys and at the end of war was present for the surrender of the High Seas Fleet at Rosyth, Scotland on 21 November 1918. On 1 May 1919, Erin was assigned to the Home Fleet's 3rd Battle Squadron, but entered the reserves at Portland Harbour in October at the Nore. From July to August 1920 Erin underwent a refit as a gunnery practice ship, but came to be in violation of the Washington Naval Treaty of 1922 and was sold for scrap on 19 December 1922.

Ship	Main guns	Armour	Displacement	Propulsion	Service		
Ship	Main guns	Armour	Displacement	Propulsion	Laid down	Commissioned	Fate
HMS Erin	10 × 13.5 in (343 mm)	12 in (305 mm)	22,780 long tons (23,150 t)	4 × shafts 4 x Parsons turbines 21 knots (39 km/h; 24 mph)	6 December 1911	31 August 1914	Sold for scrap December 1922

== HMS Canada ==
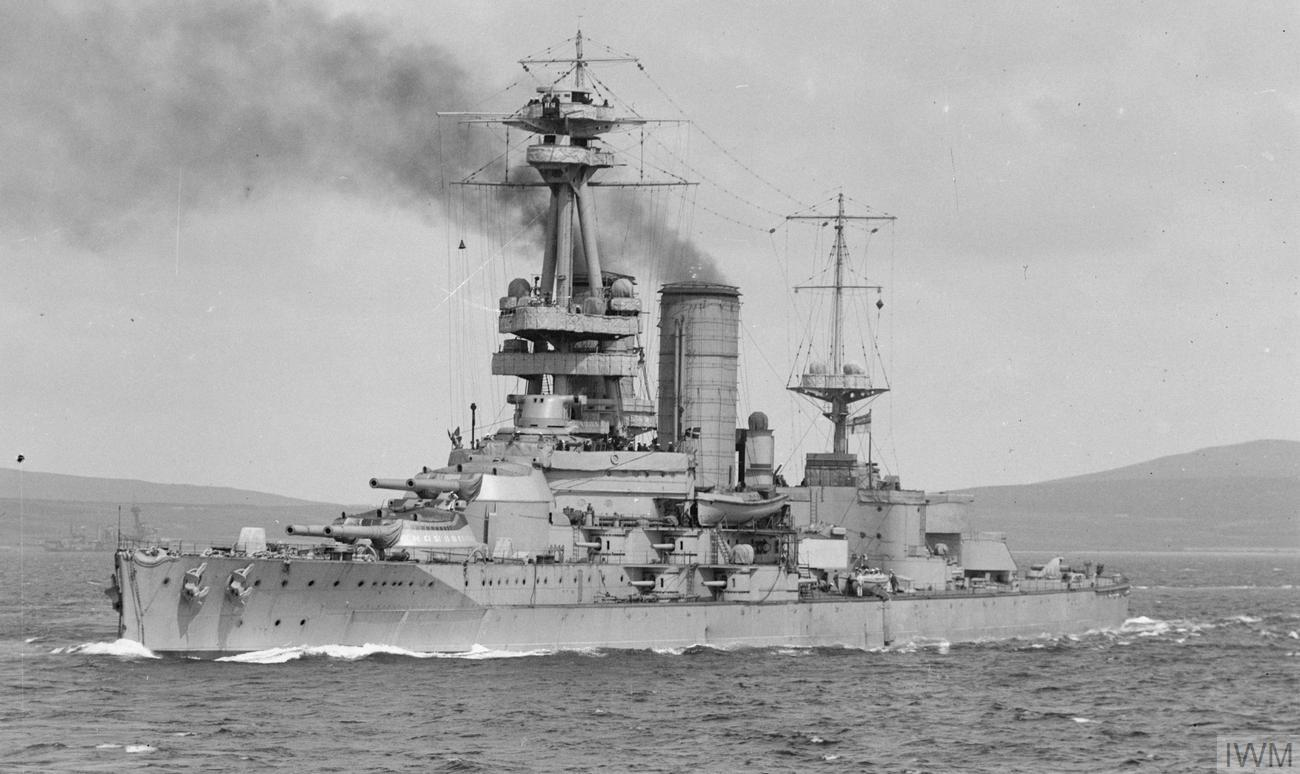
HMS Canada

In 1911, Chile ordered two battleships, Almirante Latorre and Almirante Cochrane (later HMS Eagle) from the Armstrong Whitworth company. Canada resembled the British Iron Duke-class battleships, but had changes in its above-deck structures and was longer at 625 feet (191 m). She was also more heavily armed, sporting ten 45-calibre 14-inch (360 mm) main guns and sixteen 50-calibre Mk XI 6-inch (150 mm) secondary guns, but lightly armoured with only 9 inches (230 mm) on her belt, making her an oddity in the Royal Navy. Her propulsion means was also unusual for British battleships. Four shafts were powered by two sets of Brown & Curtis and Parsons steam turbines gave Canada a top speed of 24 kn (44 km/h; 28 mph), making her one of the Royal Navy's fastest battleships.

On 9 September 1914, the British government purchased Almirante Latorre from Chile and christened her HMS Canada and undertook some minor alterations. She was commissioned on 15 October 1915, and assigned to the 4th Battle Squadron. She participated in the Battle of Jutland on 31 May 1916, firing a totality of 42 shells from her main guns and 109 secondary shells at SMS Wiesbaden, an unspecified German capital ship, and several destroyers, but did not make or receive any hits. Canada was transferred to the 1st Battle Squadron on 12 June 1916 and subsequently underwent more modification, and was placed in the reserves in March 1919. In April of the next year, she was sold back to Chile and resumed her original name.

Ship	Main guns	Armour	Displacement	Propulsion	Service		
Ship	Main guns	Armour	Displacement	Propulsion	Laid down	Commissioned	Fate
HMS Canada	10 × 14 in (356 mm)	9 inches (229 mm)	28,622 long tons (29,080 t)	4 × shafts 2 x Brown & Curtiss, 2 x Parsons turbines 23–24 kn (43–44 km/h; 26–28 mph)	27 November 1911	15 October 1915	Resold to Chile, April 1920

== Queen Elizabeth class ==
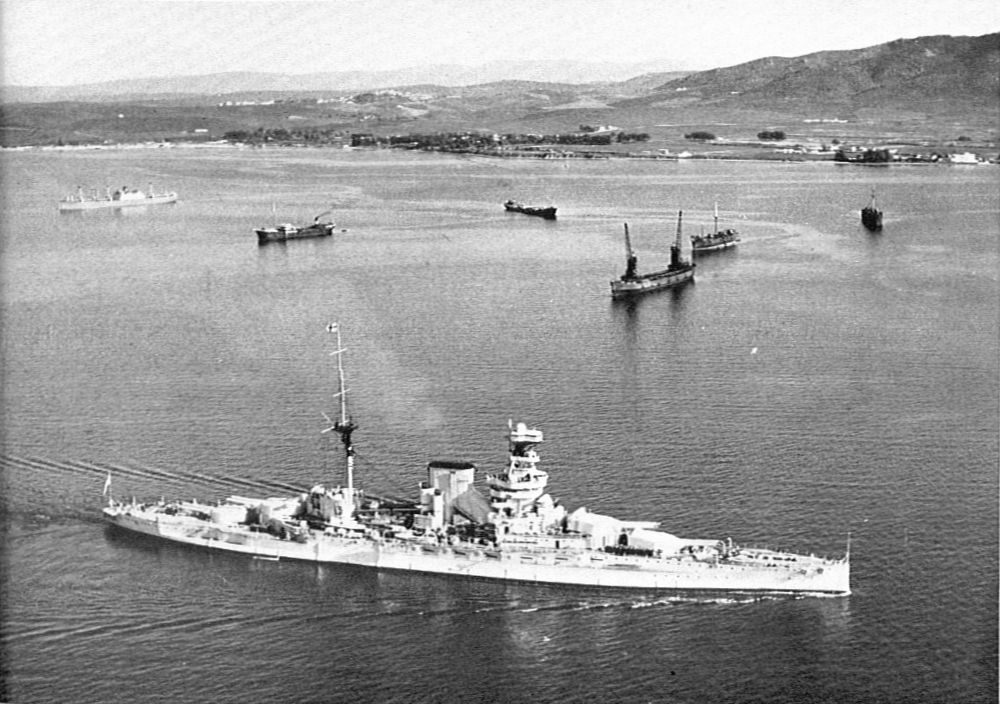
HMS Queen Elizabeth

The Queen Elizabeth-class super-dreadnoughts, HMS Queen Elizabeth, HMS Warspite, HMS Valiant, HMS Barham, and HMS Malaya, were a line of five, originally six, battleships. (Note: There was originally to be a sixth Queen Elizabeth-class battleship, HMS Agincourt, but she was cancelled before construction began.) They had a main armament of eight 15-inch (381 mm) guns arranged in four twin turrets. The new calibre guns were intended to still give the Royal Navy an advantage in range over newer American and Japanese ships which the Admiralty expected were to be armed with 14-inch guns. The initial design was for a five turret ship, but was reduced to four when it was found that even just four turrets of the new 15 inch guns would still provide greater broadside hitting power (15,000 pounds (6,800 kg)) compared to the previous Iron Duke-class (14,000 pounds (6,400 kg)). Secondary armament was fourteen 6-inch, two 3-inch anti-aircraft and four 21-inch torpedoes tubes. The space saved by the reduction of one turret was used to house additional boilers which gave the ships a speed of 24–25 knots (44–46 km/h; 28–29 mph).

Ship	Main guns	Displacement	Propulsion	Service		
Ship	Main guns	Displacement	Propulsion	Laid down	Commissioned	Fate
HMS Queen Elizabeth	8 × 15 in (381 mm)	27,500 long tons (27,940 t)	4 × shafts Parsons turbines (Queen Elizabeth, Warspite, Malaya); Brown & Curtiss turbines (Barham and Valiant); 24 × boilers	21 October 1912	January 1915	Sold for scrap April 1948
HMS Warspite	8 × 15 in (381 mm)	27,500 long tons (27,940 t)	4 × shafts Parsons turbines (Queen Elizabeth, Warspite, Malaya); Brown & Curtiss turbines (Barham and Valiant); 24 × boilers	31 October 1912	March 1915	Sold for scrap July 1946
HMS Barham	8 × 15 in (381 mm)	27,500 long tons (27,940 t)	4 × shafts Parsons turbines (Queen Elizabeth, Warspite, Malaya); Brown & Curtiss turbines (Barham and Valiant); 24 × boilers	24 February 1913	October 1915	Torpedoed and sunk by U-331 25 November 1941
HMS Valiant	8 × 15 in (381 mm)	27,500 long tons (27,940 t)	4 × shafts Parsons turbines (Queen Elizabeth, Warspite, Malaya); Brown & Curtiss turbines (Barham and Valiant); 24 × boilers	31 January 1913	February 1916	Sold for scrap March 1948
HMS Malaya	8 × 15 in (381 mm)	27,500 long tons (27,940 t)	4 × shafts Parsons turbines (Queen Elizabeth, Warspite, Malaya); Brown & Curtiss turbines (Barham and Valiant); 24 × boilers	20 October 1913	February 1916	Sold for scrap February 1948
HMS Agincourt	8 × 15 in (381 mm)	27,500 long tons (27,940 t)	4 × shafts Parsons turbines (Queen Elizabeth, Warspite, Malaya); Brown & Curtiss turbines (Barham and Valiant); 24 × boilers	—N/a		Cancelled August 1914

== Revenge class ==
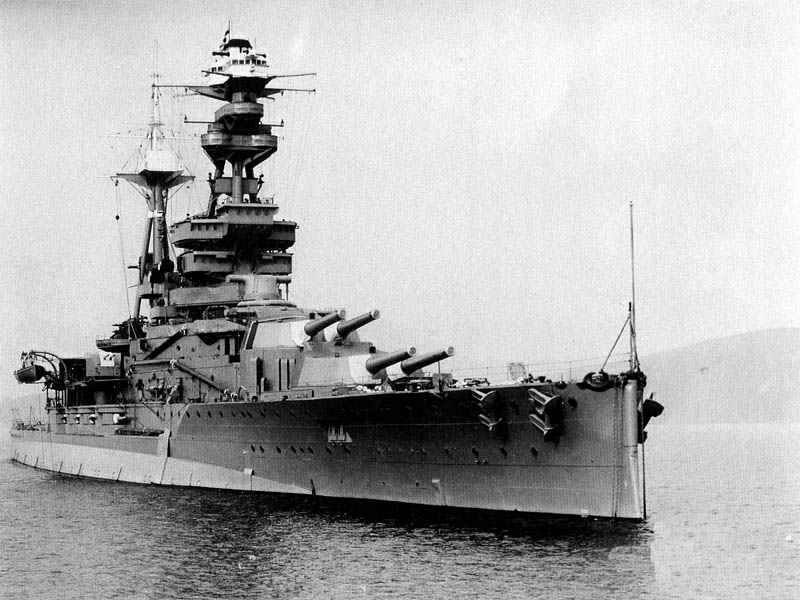
HMS Royal Oak

The Revenge class (sometimes known as the Royal Sovereign class) were designed as a cheaper alternative to the Queen Elizabeth class. Plans had initially been for a class of eight ships, but, at the start of the First World War, work stopped on all new capital ships and the last three planned ships of the class - Renown, Repulse and Resistance - were cancelled. (The first two of these were eventually redesigned as battlecruisers.) During design they were planned to have a maximum speed of just over 21 knots (39 km/h; 24 mph) and had reverted to coal- and oil-fuelled propulsion. However, in 1915, this was changed and they became oil-fuelled only. Secondary armament was fourteen 6-inch, two 3-inch anti-aircraft, four 3-pounder guns and four 21-inch torpedoes. Both Revenge and Royal Oak were completed in time to take part in the Battle of Jutland. Royal Oak was torpedoed at anchor in the supposedly safe harbour of Scapa Flow soon after the start of Second World War.

Ship	Main guns	Displacement	Propulsion	Service		
Ship	Main guns	Displacement	Propulsion	Laid down	Commissioned	Fate
HMS Revenge	8 × 15 in (381 mm)/42 Mk I	28,000 long tons (28,450 t)	4 × shafts Parsons turbines 18 × boilers	22 December 1913	March 1916	Sold for scrap February 1948
HMS Royal Sovereign	8 × 15 in (381 mm)/42 Mk I	28,000 long tons (28,450 t)	4 × shafts Parsons turbines 18 × boilers	15 January 1914	May 1916	Sold for scrap February 1949
HMS Royal Oak	8 × 15 in (381 mm)/42 Mk I	28,000 long tons (28,450 t)	4 × shafts Parsons turbines 18 × boilers	15 January 1914	May 1916	Torpedoed and sunk by U-47 14 October 1939
HMS Resolution	8 × 15 in (381 mm)/42 Mk I	28,000 long tons (28,450 t)	4 × shafts Parsons turbines 18 × boilers	29 November 1913	May 1916	Sold for scrap February 1949
HMS Ramillies	8 × 15 in (381 mm)/42 Mk I	28,000 long tons (28,450 t)	4 × shafts Parsons turbines 18 × boilers	12 November 1913	September 1917	Sold for scrap 1948
Renown	8 × 15 in (381 mm)/42 Mk I	28,000 long tons (28,450 t)	4 × shafts Parsons turbines 18 × boilers	12 November 1913	20 September 1916	Converted to Battlecruiser
Repulse	8 × 15 in (381 mm)/42 Mk I	28,000 long tons (28,450 t)	4 × shafts Parsons turbines 18 × boilers	12 November 1913	18 August 1916	Converted to Battlecruiser
Resistance	8 × 15 in (381 mm)/42 Mk I	28,000 long tons (28,450 t)	4 × shafts Parsons turbines 18 × boilers			Canceled

== N3 class ==
The N3-class, like the contemporary G3-class battlecruiser design, was planned in response to other nations' intentions to build superior navies. The design concentrated the main guns forward of the bridge to save weight (while still allowing thick enough armour over the critical parts) by shortening the length of the armoured citadel - although, they still would've been about twice the displacement of their predecessors. The design was approved in late 1921, but, in early 1922 the major naval powers signed the Washington Naval Treaty, limiting the size and number of warships in their respective navies and thus resulting in the design's cancellation. (The treaty set an upper limit of 35,000 long tons (36,000 t) displacement and 16-inch guns.) The ships had not been ordered nor had construction been started when they were canceled.

Ship	Main guns	Displacement	Propulsion	Notes
4 ships	9 × 18 in (457 mm)	about 48,000 long tons (48,800 t)	2 shafts, geared steam turbines	Never ordered

== Nelson class ==
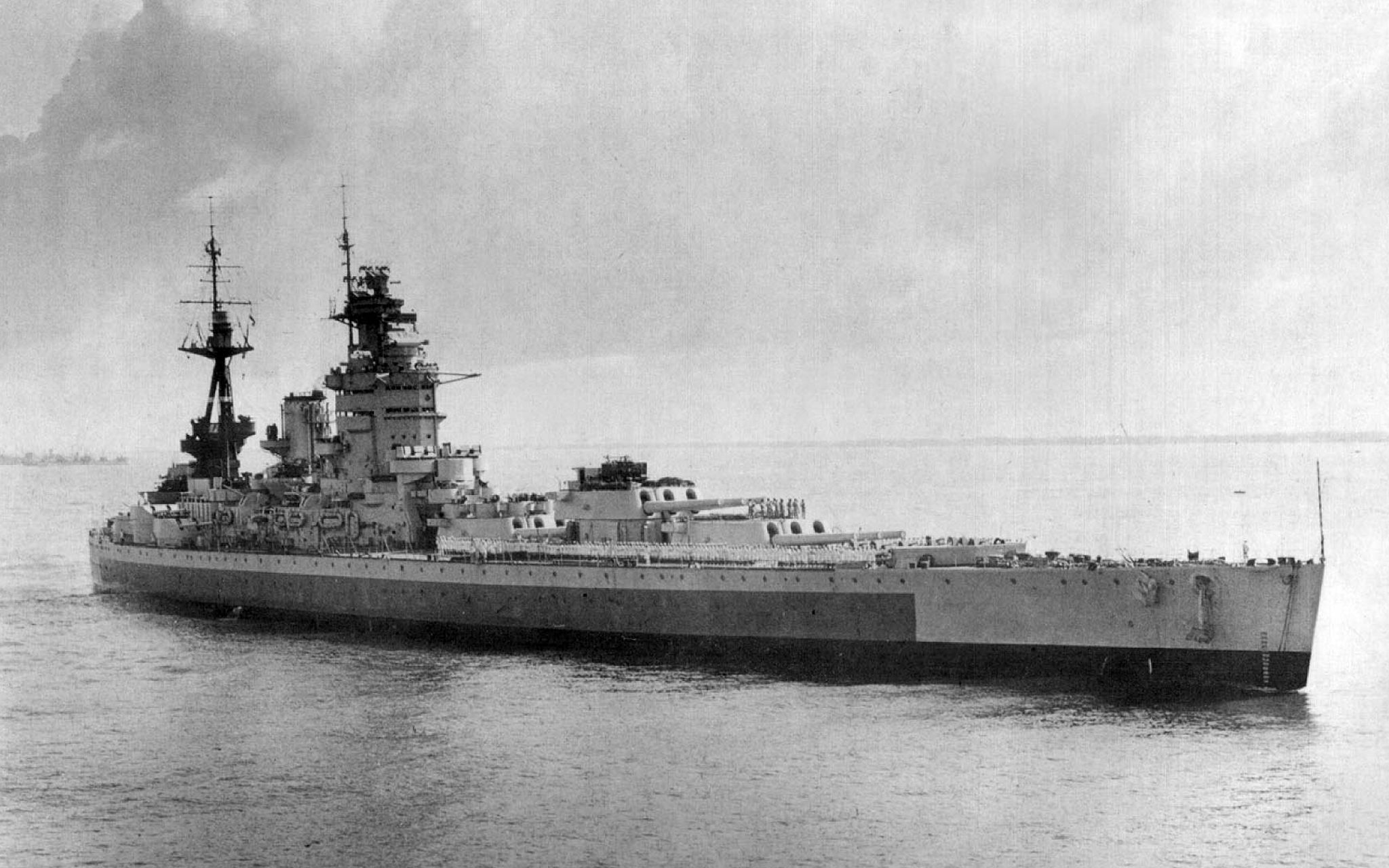
HMS Nelson

The two ships of the Nelson class were the only new battleships the Royal Navy were allowed to build under the terms of the Washington Naval Treaty. The layout was based on that of the N3 battleship and G3 battlecruiser but further reduced to come under the weight limit. Nine BL 16 inch Mk I guns – the same as were to have been used on the G3 battlecruisers – were carried in three forward turrets. Secondary armament was twelve 6-inch guns mounted in six turrets at the rear of the ship, six 4.7 inches (119 mm) anti-aircraft guns, seven eight-barrelled 2-pounder "pompom" mountings, four quadruple 40 mm Bofors guns and sixty five 20 mm Oerlikon cannon.

Ship	Main guns	Displacement	Propulsion	Service		
Ship	Main guns	Displacement	Propulsion	Laid down	Commissioned	Fate
HMS Nelson	9 × 16 in (406 mm)	33,900 long tons (34,440 t)	2 × shafts Brown-Curtis turbines 8 × boilers	28 December 1922	15 August 1927	Sold for scrap 15 March 1949
HMS Rodney	9 × 16 in (406 mm)	33,900 long tons (34,440 t)	2 × shafts Brown-Curtis turbines 8 × boilers	28 December 1922	10 November 1927	Sold for scrap 26 March 1948

== King George V class (1939) ==
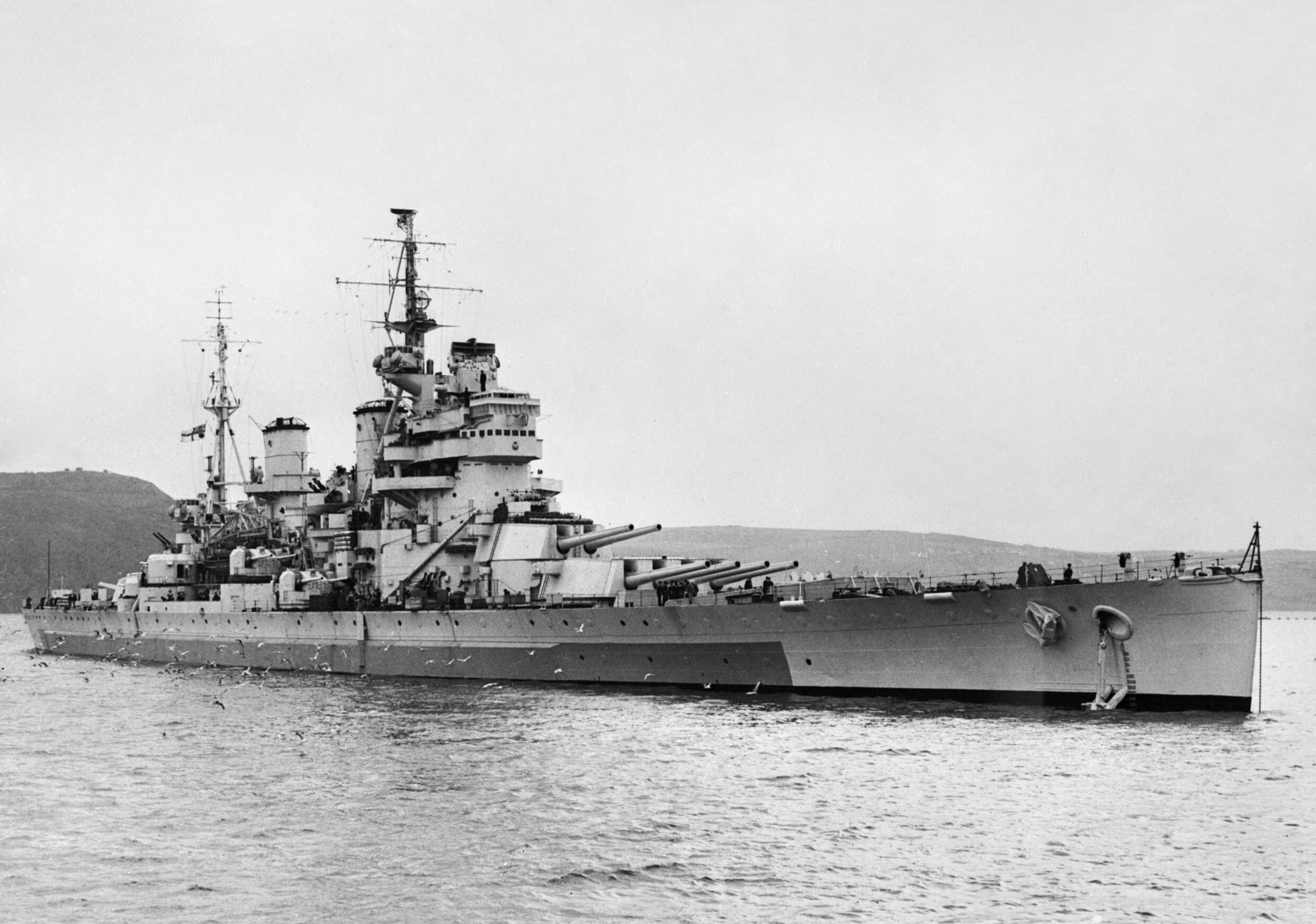
HMS Anson at Devonport March 1945.

The King George V class of ships were criticized for having 14-inch main guns (the preceding Nelson class had larger, though relatively lighter 16 inch guns). The decision to use 14-inch guns was taken in October 1935, while the United Kingdom was negotiating for a continuation of the Naval Treaties with the other parties to the London Treaty. The British Government favoured a reduction in the maximum gun calibre to 14 inches and, in early October, the government learned that the United States would support this position if the Japanese could also be persuaded to do so. Since the large guns needed to be ordered by the end of the year in order for ships to enter service on time, the British Admiralty decided on 14-inch guns for the King George V class. The guns were arranged in three turrets, two with four and one (behind and above the forward turret) with two guns. Secondary armament was sixteen QF 5.25-inch Mk I guns, four eight-barrelled 2-pounder "pom-pom" anti-aircraft mountings (King George V and Prince of Wales the later ships all had six mountings). Anson and Howe had eighteen Oerlikon 20 mm cannon and the Duke of York six. They were all fitted with amidships catapults for the three Supermarine Walrus spotter/patrol aircraft they carried. The King George V class were designed to reach a speed of over 27 knots. As the treaty negotiations collapsed, this lack of speed and the smaller size of their main armament left them slower and with a lesser broadside than foreign battleships that were being produced around the same time. However, their main armour belt was thicker than others, with the exception of the two very large ships of the Yamato class from Japan.

Ship	Main guns	Displacement	Propulsion	Service		
Ship	Main guns	Displacement	Propulsion	Laid down	Commissioned	Fate
HMS King George V	10 × 14 in (356 mm)	36,730 long tons (37,320 t)	4 × shafts Parsons turbines 8 × boilers	1 January 1937	1 October 1940	Sold for scrap 1957
HMS Prince of Wales	10 × 14 in (356 mm)	36,730 long tons (37,320 t)	4 × shafts Parsons turbines 8 × boilers	1 January 1937	31 March 1941	Sunk December 1941 by Japanese air attack
HMS Duke of York	10 × 14 in (356 mm)	36,730 long tons (37,320 t)	4 × shafts Parsons turbines 8 × boilers	5 May 1937	4 November 1941	Sold for scrap 1957
HMS Anson	10 × 14 in (356 mm)	36,730 long tons (37,320 t)	4 × shafts Parsons turbines 8 × boilers	20 July 1937	22 June 1942	Sold for scrap 1957
HMS Howe	10 × 14 in (356 mm)	36,730 long tons (37,320 t)	4 × shafts Parsons turbines 8 × boilers	1 June 1937	29 August 1942	Sold for scrap 1958

== Lion class ==
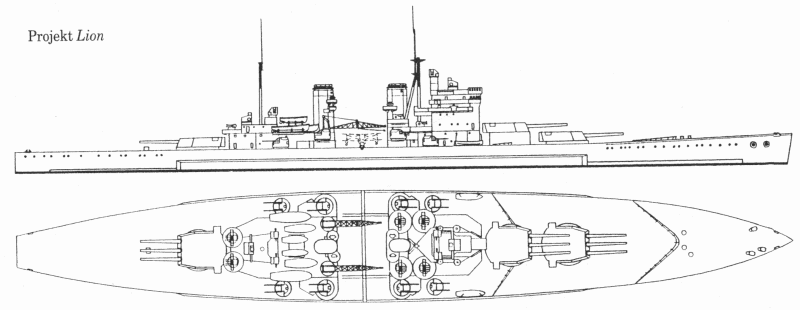
Lion Drawing

During the Second London Naval Treaty of 1936, the upper limit for battleships was agreed by the powers attending but an escalator clause allowed for increases if parties defaulted. By 1938 concerns about the Japanese prompted Britain and the United States to raise the limits allowed to 45,000 long tons (46,000 t) and 16 in (406 mm) guns. The Admiralty had planned to scrap the ineffective Revenge class when the King George V ships entered service. These plans were soon changed, the Admiralty's new ambition was to raise a battle fleet of 20 ships, 15 of them to match the new standard, keeping the Revenge class until at least 1942. To meet this target the navy wanted three battleships added to the 1938 plans, but in the end only two were given the go ahead and even then they had to use reserve slipways, normally only used in emergencies. At the same time it was identified that unless the 1938 ships were completed by 1942, the Royal Navy between 1940 and 1943 would be at a disadvantage with only twelve modern and eight older battleships against a combined German–Japanese fleet of twenty modern ships. Construction work was halted at start of war so that resources could be diverted to more important production and although design was revised during war no further work took place.

Ship	Main guns	Displacement	Propulsion	Service		
Ship	Main guns	Displacement	Propulsion	Laid down	Commissioned	Fate
HMS Lion	9 × 16 in (410 mm)	40,000 long tons (41,000 t)	—	4 July 1939	—	Scrapped 15 October 1945
HMS Temeraire	9 × 16 in (410 mm)	40,000 long tons (41,000 t)	—	1 June 1939	—	Scrapped 15 October 1945
HMS Conqueror	9 × 16 in (410 mm)	40,000 long tons (41,000 t)	—	Cancelled		
HMS Thunderer	9 × 16 in (410 mm)	40,000 long tons (41,000 t)	—	Cancelled		

== HMS Vanguard ==
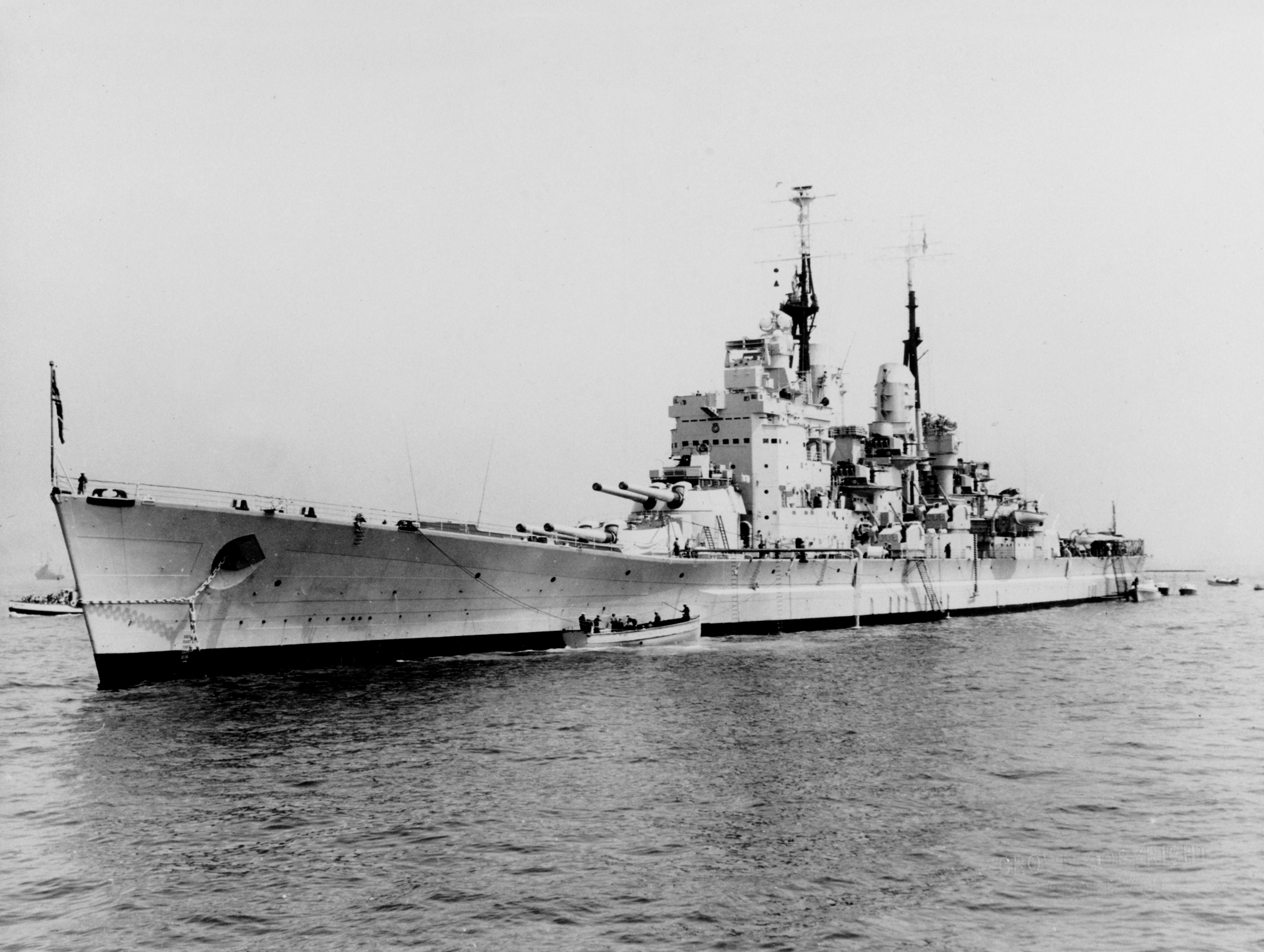
Vanguard in 1950

HMS Vanguard was the final Royal Navy battleship. She was armed with eight 42-calibre 15-inch (380 mm) main guns, taken from the Courageous-class battlecruisers, and sixteen 50-calibre dual-purpose 5.25-inch (133 mm) secondary guns. 4.5–14 inches (114–356 mm) of Krupp armour made up the waterline belt protected 814-foot-4-inch (248.21 m)-long Vanguard. Displacing 44,500 long tons (45,200 t), she was powered by four Parsons steam turbines, one shaft each, that gave her a top speed of 31.57 kn (58.47 km/h; 36.33 mph).

Ship	Main guns	Displacement	Propulsion	Service		
Ship	Main guns	Displacement	Propulsion	Laid down	Commissioned	Fate
HMS Vanguard	8 × 15 in (381 mm)	44,500 long tons (45,200 t)	4 × shafts 4 x Parsons turbines 31.57 kn (58.47 km/h; 36.33 mph)	2 October 1941	25 April 1946	Sold for scrap 4 August 1960

== See also ==
- List of battleships
- List of ironclads of the Royal Navy
- List of pre-dreadnought battleships of the Royal Navy
- List of battlecruisers of the Royal Navy
