= Chinese cruiser Chao Ho =

1911 Chao Ho-class cruiser

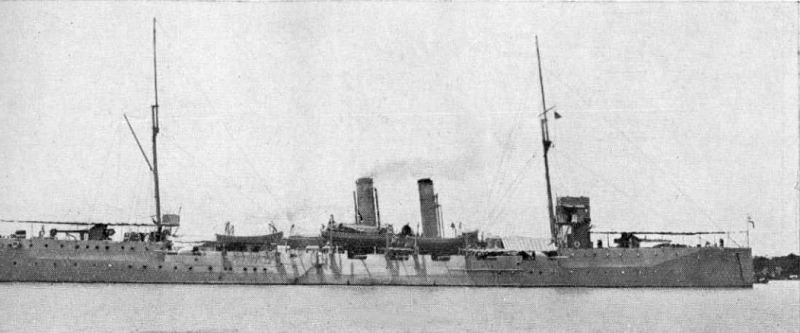
- Chinese cruiser Chao Ho

History

Republic of China
- Name: Chao Ho (肇和)
- Builder: Armstrong Whitworth
- Cost: £210,000
- Laid down: 7 October 1910
- Launched: 23 October 1911
- Completed: 21 February 1912
- Recommissioned: 31 December 1928
- Decommissioned: December 1923
- Stricken: December 1923
- Home port: Guangzhou
- Fate: Sunk 28 September 1937 by Japanese Aircraft
- Reacquired: 29 December 1928

Beiyang Government
- Name: Chao Ho (肇和)
- Acquired: December 1923
- Commissioned: 5 January 1924
- Home port: Qingdao
- Fate: Reintegrated into the Republic of China Navy

General characteristics
- Class & type: Chao Ho-class protected cruiser
- Displacement: 2,750 t (2,707 long tons)
- Length: 105.5 m (346 ft)
- Beam: 13 m (43 ft)
- Draught: 4.5 m (15 ft)
- Propulsion: Three-shaft Parsons steam turbines, 4 cylindrical and 4 Yarrow boilers; 6,000 hp (4,500 kW)
- Speed: 20 knots (23 mph; 37 km/h)
- Range: 4,500 nmi (8,300 km) at 10 kn (12 mph; 19 km/h)
- Complement: 283
- Armament: 2 x 1 - Armstrong Pattern NN 6-inch (152 mm)/50 guns; 4 x 1 - Elswick Pattern P 4 in (100 mm)/50 guns; 4 x 1 - Armstrong 3 in (76 mm) guns; 6 x 1 - 47/40 Hotchkiss guns; 2 × 37 mm (1 in) Maxim AA guns; 2 × 450 mm (18 in) torpedo tubes
- Armour: Deck: 19 to 25 mm (0.75 to 0.98 in); Conning tower: 76 mm (3.0 in)

Chao Ho (Chinese: 肇和; pinyin: Zhào Hé; Wade–Giles: Chao Ho; lit. 'Harmonious Beginnings') was the lead ship of a class of her class of training protected cruisers originally built for the Manchu Qing Dynasty.

== Development ==
The Chao Ho class were part of a largely unrealized seven-year modernization program by the Qing Dynasty's imperial regent Zaifeng, Prince Chun that would have ordered a number of modern battleships, cruisers, torpedo boats and submarines. Shortly before the completion of her sea trials and impending induction into the Imperial Chinese Navy, the 267-year reign of the Manchu Qing Dynasty came to an end when Dr. Sun Yat-Sen's Xinhai Revolution forced the abdication of the child-emperor Puyi and created the Republic of China. The Chao Ho would subsequently enter service with the Republic of China Navy.

The Chao Ho-class cruisers were unusual in that all three semi-sister ships were built in different ship building yards, and although all three ships were built to the same basic design, they varied in size, armour and displacement, of which Chao Ho was the largest and longest, and all three ships carried varied assortments of guns (as opposed to uniform main armament). These were done to increase the educational effectiveness of the ships, in order to familiarize their crews with various boiler and weapons systems.

Chao Ho's hull was laid down on 7 October 1910 by at Elswick, Tyne and Wear by Armstrong Whitworth. She was launched on 23 October 1911 and finished her naval trials on 21 February 1912, nine days after the Xinhai Revolution brought down the Qing Dynasty. In 1913, after a long loan negotiation, she was delivered to China in March.

== Design ==
Chao Ho as mentioned differed from her two sister ships, as she was larger than either Ying Rui or Fei Hung. Chao Ho was 2 feet 6 inches (0.76 m) larger in beam than Ying Rui, and weighted 290 t more. Ying Rui's foremast was stepped further aft and her funnels were spaced wider. Chao Ho also had thicker armour (2 in (51 mm) compared to Ying Rui's .75 in (19 mm) on the main deck and 3 in (76 mm) compared to 1.75 in (44 mm) on her conning tower). Chao Ho's primary armament were two Armstrong Pattern NN 6-inch (152 mm)/50 guns which were mounted on the forecastle and poop. As a protected cruiser Chao Ho did not have belt armor. The only armor was on her deck, guns and conning tower. The remaining artillery were placed on the main deck.

== Service record ==
Chao Ho's first incident was in December 1915, when the cruiser was briefly captured by Southern Chinese rebels during the National Protection War. During the lawless Warlord Era of the Republic of China, Chao Ho was often called into action to bombard rebel positions but in December 1923 Zhili Clique Warlord Wu Peifu representing the Beiyang Government bribed half of the Chinese Navy into his service including Chao Ho where they were used guard the naval base of Qingdao (formerly the German Empire concession of Jiaozhou), the most advanced port in China at the time. The fleet of five ships (the cruisers Hai Chi, Hai Chen, Chao Ho) and the gunboats Yung Hsiang and Chu Yu arrived at Qingdao on 5 January 1924 and would become known as the Northern Fleet. After the Zhili Clique's defeat during the Second Zhili–Fengtian War, control of Qingdao and its fleet passed to the Manchurian warlord Zhang Zuolin of the Fengtian clique. By this time, the Northern Fleet had been renamed the North East Fleet as the collection of ships have become known as had gone into disrepair, many unable to exceed 10 knots (19 km/h; 12 mph). Zhang, who had always been close politically to the Empire of Japan had Chao Ho and the rest of his fleet refitted by Japanese engineers in 1927.

In 1927, the Kuomintang Government of the Republic of China, led by Generalissimo Chiang Kai-shek launched his decisive Northern Expedition to finally bring the Northern Chinese warlords under his heel. While commanding his newly formed and trained National Revolutionary Army, the Kuomintang had little in the way of a navy after the mass defection of 1923. Throughout 1927 the newly refitted Chao Ho made several sorties to bombard the Nationalist naval fortifications at Wusong off the coast of Shanghai and participated in the brief occupation of the island of Kinmen off the coast of Xiamen in May 1928. After months of hard fighting, the Kuomintang eventually defeated the Warlord cliques after capturing Beijing in 1928. The fleeing Zhang was assassinated when the train he was in was blown up by Japanese officers of the Kwantung Army to punish him for his failures in defeating Chiang. His son, Zhang Xueliang then pledged allegiance to Chiang Kai-shek and the Kuomintang government. The former Beiyang Governments North East Fleet was reintegrated into the Republic of China Navy. In 1930 two QF 2 pounder anti-aircraft guns were added to Chao Ho on a platform at the base of the mainmast. The former North East Fleet was renamed Third Squadron and remained in Qingdao.

Problems with Chao Ho did not end with her return in 1928 though. In July 1933, a lieutenant from the auxiliary gunboat Chen Hai attempted to assassinate Admiral Shen Hung-lieh (who was also the mayor of Qingdao) over wages and was immediately executed. In sympathy the Third Squadron which consisted of Hai Chi, Hai Chen and Chao Ho mutinied and sailed to Guangzhou, governed by general Chen Jitang. Due to the fractured, clique ridden nature of the Republic of China in the wake of the Northern Expedition, the mutineers were welcomed by the city as useful reinforcements for the Cantonese faction within the Chinese government. Unfortunately, even in Guangzhou, the former North East Fleet remained underpaid, underemployed and unappreciated. When the original leader of the mutineers, Rear-Admiral Kiang Hsi-yuan was replaced by a local Cantonese commander, the three ships once again mutinied and left Guangzhou on 15 June 1935. Chao Ho was left behind not long after due to becoming stuck in mud. Hai Chi and Hai Chen would go on to be involved in a naval stand off between themselves and the new, modern light cruiser Ning Hai which was carrying the admiral of the fleet Chan Chak on board. Several warning shots were fired by Ning Hai towards the mutineers but, after tense negotiations the situation was resolved without bloodshed on 18 July.

War between China and Japan resumed in 1937, with Japan launched a full-scale invasion of China, and quickly capturing the cities of Beiping and Tianjin. At the time Chao Ho was stationed at the naval fort in Bocca Tigris to guard the city of Guangzhou and the entrance to the Pearl River. On 14 September 1937. Chao Ho and Hai Chow (formerly the Arabis-class sloop HMS Pentstemon) engaged the Japanese cruiser Yūbari and the destroyers Hayate and Oite. The Japanese ships were forced to retreat with the aide of the Bocca Tigris' forts land based artillery but both ships were damaged. After this set back Japan sent the aircraft carriers Ryūjō and Hōshō against the forts and ships at the mouth of the Pearl River as part of a larger strategic bombing campaign against the Pearl River Delta and the city of Guangzhou, the fortifications and ports were heavily bombed. On 30 September 1937 Chao Ho was sunk by Japanese aircraft of the Imperial Japanese Navy Air Service.

== See also ==
- Beiyang Navy
- Zhili clique
- Fengtian clique
- Warlord Era
