= Greek cruiser Elli (1912) =

Greek protected cruiser in service from 1914 until sunk in 1940

Coordinates: 37°32′9″N 25°9′3″E

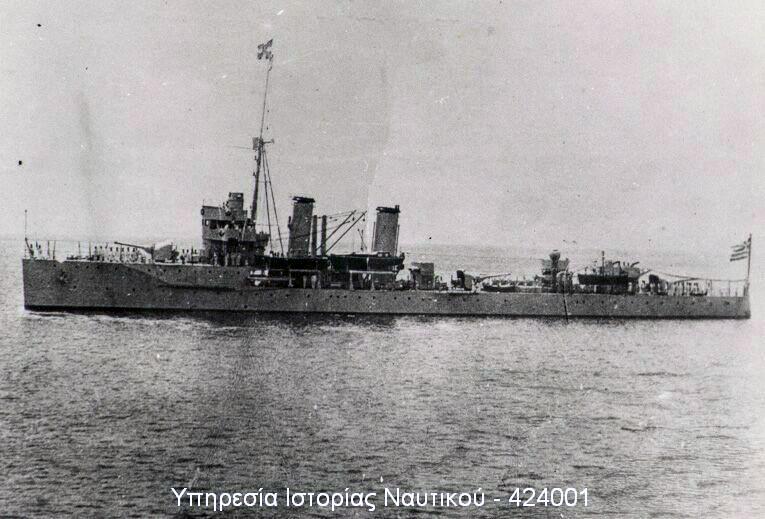
- Elli - Εύδρομον Έλλη

History

Greece
- Name: Elli
- Namesake: Naval Battle of Elli
- Builder: New York Shipbuilding
- Laid down: 14 June 1911
- Launched: 9 May 1912
- Completed: November 1913
- Commissioned: 1914
- Fate: Sunk 15 August 1940 off Tinos harbour
- Notes: Previously Fēi Hóng

General characteristics
- Class & type: Chao Ho-class protected cruiser
- Displacement: 2,115 long tons (2,149 t) standard; 2,600 long tons (2,642 t) full load
- Length: 98 m (321 ft 6 in)
- Beam: 12 m (39 ft 4 in)
- Draft: 4.3 m (14 ft 1 in)
- Propulsion: 3 propellers
- Speed: 26 knots (48 km/h; 30 mph) new; 18 knots (33 km/h; 21 mph) by 1940
- Complement: 238
- Armament: 3 × 6-inch (152 mm) guns (3 × 1); 2 × 3-inch (76 mm) guns; 3 × 40 mm (1.6 in) AA guns; 2 × 19-inch (483 mm) torpedo tubes; Capacity for 100 mines
- Armour: Deck in (25mm) on flat, 2in (50mm) on slopes

Elli (Greek: Κ/Δ Έλλη) was a 2,600 ton Greek protected cruiser (Greek: Εύδρομο Καταδρομικό) named for a naval battle of the First Balkan War in which Greece was victorious. She was completed in 1913 and commissioned in 1914. Elli saw action during World War I and in the disastrous Asia Minor Expedition. An Italian submarine sank her before the outbreak of the Greco-Italian War on 15 August 1940 while she sat at anchor.

== History ==
She was originally one of three cruisers of the ill-fated Chao Ho class. The Chinese government had ordered her as the Fei Hong (Chinese: 飛鴻; pinyin: Féi Hóng; Wade–Giles: Fei Hung; lit. 'Flying Swan'); however, the Nationalist revolution in 1912–13 resulted in the Chinese government cancelling the purchase. New York Shipbuilding in the United States completed her in 1914 and sold her to Greece, which purchased her as part of its program of naval expansion after the Balkan Wars.

Elli saw action during World War I. Initially, Greece followed a course of neutrality, with Prime Minister Eleftherios Venizelos favoring the Entente and pro-German King Constantine I advocating neutrality. This dispute eventually led to a deep political conflict, known as the "National Schism". In November 1916, to apply pressure on the royal government in Athens, the French confiscated the Greek ships. They continued to operate with French crews, primarily in convoy escort and patrol duties in the Aegean, until Greece entered the war on the side of the Allies in June 1917, at which point they were returned to Greece. Subsequently, the Greek Navy took part in the Allied operations in the Aegean.

In 1920 she underwent a reconstruction in France, along with the armored cruiser Georgios Averof, during which she obtained modern anti-aircraft armament and the equipment to carry and lay 100 sea mines.

In the disastrous Asia Minor Expedition, the future King Paul of Greece was a sub-lieutenant on board Elli and witnessed the evacuation of Smyrna in September 1922.

== Fate and aftermath ==
The Delfino sank her during peacetime, at 8:25 am on 15 August 1940, while she rode at anchor near the island of Tinos. Elli was in Tinos participating in the celebrations of the Feast of the Dormition of the Theotokos. One of the three torpedoes fired hit Elli under the one operating boiler and she caught fire and sank. Nine petty officers and sailors were killed and 24 were wounded. The same submarine attempted to torpedo the passenger ships MV Elsi and MV Esperos anchored in the port. This attempt failed and the torpedoes damaged only a section of the port's wharf.

Fragments of the torpedoes were recovered and identified as Italian in origin. The Greek government however, trying to avoid a confrontation with Italy at the time, announced that the nationality of the attacking submarine was unknown, an act that did not forestall the outbreak of the Greco-Italian War two months later, and did not convince the Greek people, who were well aware of the perpetrator.

After the war, as compensation for the sinking of Elli, Italy gave Greece the cruiser Eugenio di Savoia which was commissioned in June 1950 for the Royal Hellenic Navy with the name Elli. She served until 1973. Since 1982, a Standard-class frigate, Elli, the lead ship of the Elli class, has continued the name.
