= Chinese cruiser Ying Rui =

1911 Chao Ho-class cruiser

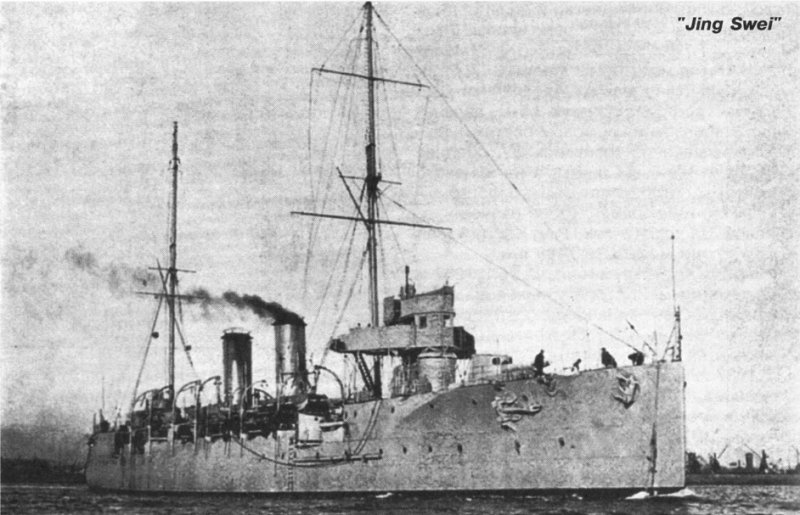
- Chinese cruiser Ying Rui

History

Republic of China
- Name: Ying Rui (應瑞)
- Builder: Vickers Limited
- Cost: £204,000
- Laid down: 12 December 1910
- Launched: 13 July 1911
- Completed: 2 December 1911
- Home port: Nanjing
- Fate: Sunk 25 October 1937 by Japanese Aircraft

General characteristics
- Class & type: Chao Ho-class protected cruiser
- Displacement: 2,460 long tons (2,500 tonnes)
- Length: 330 feet (100 metres)
- Beam: 39.5 ft (12.0 m)
- Draught: 13 ft (4.0 m)
- Propulsion: Three-shaft Parsons steam turbines, 2 cylindrical and 4 White-Foster boilers; 6,000 hp (4,500 kW)
- Speed: 20 knots (23 mph; 37 km/h)
- Range: 5,000 nmi (9,300 km) at 10 kn (12 mph; 19 km/h)
- Complement: 270
- Armament: 2 x 1 - Vickers Mark J 6-inch (152 mm)/45 guns; 4 x 1 - 4 in (100 mm)/50 guns; 4 x 1 - 14pdr QF guns; 6 x 1 - 47/40 Hotchkiss guns; 2 × 37 mm (1 in) Maxim guns; 2 × 18 in (457 mm) torpedo tubes
- Armour: Deck: 0.75–1.5 inches (1.9–3.8 cm); Conning tower: 3 in (7.6 cm)

Ying Rui (Chinese: 應瑞; pinyin: Yìng Ruì; Wade–Giles: Ying Swei; lit. 'Propitious Promise') was a protected cruiser built for the Imperial Chinese Navy, which served with the Republic of China Navy. She was built by Vickers Limited in Barrow-in-Furness, England. She was one of three Chao Ho class protected cruisers built, although each one was to different specifications. Initially designated as a training vessel, she saw action at Amoy (now Xiamen) during the Warlord era, before returning again to her training role.

During the Second Sino-Japanese War, Ying Rui was assigned to the Central Fleet. She was bombarded during August and September 1937 by planes of the Imperial Japanese Navy, becoming damaged. By the following month, she was the last vessel of the fleet left afloat. As her armament was being removed for use as shore batteries during the Battle of Nanjing, she was once again attacked by planes from the Japanese aircraft carriers, and was sunk.

== Design and development ==
The Chao Ho class were part of a seven-year modernization program by the Qing dynasty that would have seen the construction of a new modern fleet, including seven battleships and 20 cruisers. The year after being laid down for the Imperial Chinese Navy, the 267-year reign of the Manchu Qing Dynasty came to an end when Dr. Sun Yat-Sen's Xinhai Revolution forced the abdication of the child-emperor Puyi and created the Republic of China. Ying Rui would spend the rest of her service with the Republic of China Navy.

The Chao Ho-class protected cruisers were unusual in that all three semi-sister ships were built in different ship building yards, and although all three ships were built to the same basic design, they varied in size, armour and displacement. Ying Rui was the smallest of the three, measuring 330 feet (100 metres) long overall. She had a beam of 39.5 ft (12.0 m) and a draught of 13 ft (4.0 m). Ying Rui displaced 2,460 long tons (2,500 tonnes), and carried a crew of 270 officers and enlisted men. As a protected cruiser Ying Rui did not have belt armor. She was equipped with an armored protected deck, which was 1.5 inches (3.8 cm) thick on the slopes, 0.75 in (1.9 cm) on the flat and 3 in (7.6 cm) on the conning tower.

Ying Rui's foremast was stepped further aft and her funnels were spaced wider than her sister ships. Chao Ho and Ying Rui were the first Chinese vessels to be fitted with a three-shaft Parsons Marine steam turbine. Although primarily powered by coal, compartments for oil were built into both Ying Rui and Chao Ho. Ying Rui was equipped with a variety of armaments, including several different Vickers Limited 50 caliber guns. Of these, there were two each of 6 in (152 mm) and 3 in (76 mm) guns, and four 4 in (102 mm) guns. Other weapons included six QF 3-pounder Hotchkiss guns, two 37 mm (1 in) Maxim guns and two above water mounted torpedo tubes.

== Service history ==
Ying Rui was laid down by Vickers Limited in Barrow-in-Furness, England, in late 1910. She was launched on 13 July 1911 and completed ready for trials on 2 December 1911. The ship headed to the River Clyde, with its crew supplemented by the men of the cruiser Hai Chi, which was also in Barrow-in-Furness at the time. The trials were completed successfully by 9 December. In 1913, after a long loan negotiation, she was delivered to China in April. She was designed and designated as a training cruiser, but on arrival in China, she found herself as one of the most modern vessels of the fledgling Republic of China Navy. In mid-1917, Admiral Sa Zhenbing was offered Ying Rui and Chao Ho to suppress the Manchu Restoration, but declined. In 1920 Ying Rui joined the training squadron of ships based in Nanjing.

In July 1923, during the Warlord era of Chinese history, Ying Rui and fellow cruiser Hai Yung departed Shanghai with orders to bombard Amoy (now Xiamen) to prevent further navy defections to the Beiyang Government of Northern China. The attack was a success, with the majority of the city re-taken. Ying Rui remained unused in major operations, and along with the rest of the Central Fleet, she declared herself for the Kuomintang on 14 March 1927 during the Northern Expedition. By 1933, Ying Rui had returned to her training role, alongside the unprotected cruiser Tung Chi and the transport Ching An (formerly the Hamburg America Line transport Sikiang). In late June 1935, Ying Rui was one of several cruisers at Hong Kong, following the mutiny of Chao Ho, Hai Chi and Hai Chen.

At the onset of the Second Sino-Japanese War, Ying Rui had been moved to the Central Fleet alongside the two newest cruisers in the Republic of China Navy, Ning Hai, Ping Hai and the cruiser Yat Sen. The fleet was stationed at Jiangyin at the mouth of the Yangtze River. Starting 14 August 1937, the Imperial Japanese Navy began a campaign of aerial bombardment during the Battle of Shanghai against Jiangyin from the aircraft carriers Ryūjō, Hōshō and Kaga. By the end of September, Ying Rui was the last unsunk cruiser, although it had been damaged from the aerial bombardment. It was decided that she should retire to Nanjing. By mid-October the entire Central Fleet had been sunk by Japanese aircraft leaving Ying Rui the sole ship of the fleet. It was then decided that Ying Rui's naval artillery would be better used as shore batteries during the Battle of Nanking. On 24 October 1937 while her cannons were being removed she was attacked by Japanese dive-bombers and sunk the following day before her artillery could be completely removed.
