= Chao Ho-class cruiser =

Chinese Navy cruiser

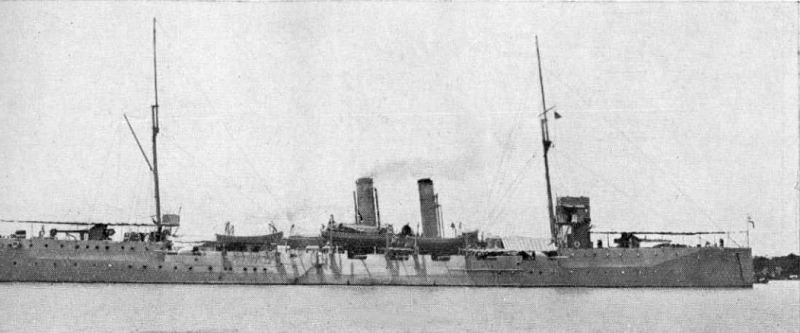
- Chinese Cruiser Chao Ho

Class overview
- Name: Chao Ho class
- Operators: Imperial Chinese Navy; Republic of China Navy; Beiyang Army; Hellenic Navy
- Preceded by: Hai Chi class
- Succeeded by: Number 64 class (Planned); Ning Hai class (Actual)
- Subclasses: Ying Rui; Elli
- Built: 1910–1913
- In commission: 1913–1940
- Completed: 3
- Lost: 3

General characteristics
- Type: Protected cruiser
- Displacement: 2,460 long tons (2,499 t)-2,750 long tons (2,794 t)
- Length: 98 m (321 ft 6 in)-105.5 m (346 ft 2 in) o/a
- Beam: 12 m (39 ft 4 in)-13 m (42 ft 8 in)
- Draught: 4 m (13 ft 1 in)-4.5 m (14 ft 9 in)
- Speed: 20 knots (23 mph; 37 km/h)-26 knots (30 mph; 48 km/h)
- Range: 4,500 nmi (8,300 km)-5,000 nmi (9,300 km) at 10 kn (12 mph; 19 km/h)
- Complement: 238-283
- Armament: 2 x 1 - 6-inch (152 mm)/50 guns; 4 x 1 - 4 in (100 mm)/50 guns; 4 x 1 - 14pdr QF guns; 6 x 1 - 47/40 Hotchkiss guns; 2 x 1 - 37/32 Maxim guns; 2 x 1 - 450 torpedo tubes
- Armour: Deck: 19–26 mm (1–1 in); Conning tower: 76 mm (3 in)

The Chao Ho class (Chinese: 肇和; pinyin: Zhào Hé; lit. 'Harmonious Beginnings') was a class of protected cruisers built for the Qing Dynasty from 1910–1913. The class would later serve the Republic of China Navy and the Royal Hellenic Navy through the National Protection War, World War I, the Greco-Turkish War, the Second Zhili–Fengtian War, the Northern Expedition, Second Sino-Japanese War and World War II.

In 1910, Imperial regent Zaifeng, Prince Chun commissioned a 7-year plan for the modernization of the Qing Dynasty's Imperial Chinese Navy. Third-rank Prince Zaixun and Admiral Sa Zhenbing were sent on a whirlwind fact-finding tour of the West, starting in Europe in October 1909 (where Admiral Sa was awarded the Order of St Michael and St George) and continuing to the United States and Japan in 1910. The Naval Commission's findings suggested that a Ministry of the Navy be created, and on 4 December 1910 the Naval Commission was made into the Ministry of the Navy with Prince Zaixun as its first minister. The commission also suggested that the various Chinese navies be unified and divided into three separate fleets, Southern, Central and Northern. Part of the ambitious modernization program was the commissioning of new state-of-the-art ships for the Navy, battleships, cruisers, torpedo boats and submarines. The contract for the building of three Chao Ho-class training cruisers were awarded to two British and one American ship building yards in 1910. The lead ship of the class was Chao Ho which was laid down in the UK at the Armstrong Whitworth naval yard in Elswick on 7 November 1910 and commissioned a year later. Ying Rui (Chinese: 應瑞; lit. 'Propitious Promise') was launched on 13 July 1911 from Vickers Limited at Barrow-in-Furness. The last of the class was Fei Hong (Chinese: 飛鴻; lit. 'Flying Swan') which was laid down on 12 May 1912 by the New York Shipbuilding Corporation and completed in November 1913. By this time China had undergone a wide-scale revolution, which had forced the abdication of Emperor Puyi, the collapse of the Qing government and the establishment of the Republic of China. The fledgling Chinese republic was uninterested in being saddled with the Manchu Qing dynasty's debts and dealings, so on 14 May 1914, Fēi Hóng, which had not yet been paid for or delivered, was sold to the Kingdom of Greece and renamed Elli (Greek: Κ/Δ Έλλη) after the decisive Battle of Elli of 1912, by the New York Shipbuilding Company.

The Chao Ho-class cruisers were unusual in that all three semi-sister ships were built in different ship building yards, and although all three ships were built to the same basic design, they varied in size, displacement, armour and boiler types, and all three ships carried varied assortments of guns (as opposed to uniform main armament). These were done to increase the educational effectiveness of the ships, in order to familiarize their crews with various boiler and weapons systems. The class was notable for being the first Chinese ships to use Parson steam turbines. While the primary fuel for the Chao Ho class remained coal, these were the first Chinese ships to carry oil for fuel as well.

== Ships ==
Name	Builder	Laid	Launched	Completed	Fate
Chao Ho (肇和)	Armstrong Whitworth	7 November 1910	23 October 1911	21 February 1912	Sunk at Guangzhou on 28 September 1937 by Japanese aircraft
Ying Rui (應瑞)	Vickers Limited	12 December 1910	13 July 1911	2 December 1911	Sunk at Nanjing on 25 October 1937 by Japanese aircraft
Fei Hong (飛鴻)	New York Shipbuilding	14 June 1911	9 May 1912	November 1913	Sold to Greece in 1914, renamed Elli, sunk at Tinos 15 August 1940
