= BL 6-inch Mk XIII – XVIII naval gun =

BL 6-inch gun
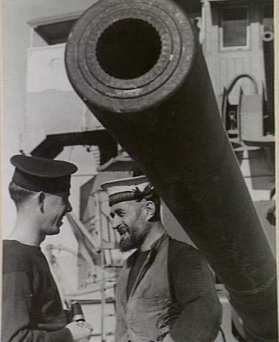
- Type: Naval gun
- Place of origin: United Kingdom

Service history
- In service: 1914–1958 (Note: Almiranye Latorre was decommissioned in 1958, but ended active service in 1951.)
- Wars: World War I World War II

Production history
- Designer: Mk XIII, XVII, XVIII : EOC; Mk XIV, XV, XVI : Vickers
- Variants: Mk XIII, XIV, XV, XVI, XVII, XVIII (Note: Britain used Roman numerals to denote Marks (models) of ordnance until after World War II. These were the thirteenth through to eighteenth models of BL 6-inch guns in British service.)

Specifications
- Barrel length: 300 inches (7.620 m) bore (50 cal)
- Shell: 100 pounds (45.36 kg)
- Calibre: 6 inches (152.4 mm)
- Muzzle velocity: Mk XIII : 2,770 feet per second (840 m/s); Mk XIV & XV : 2,900 feet per second (880 m/s); Mk XVI : 3,000 feet per second (910 m/s); Mk XVII : 2,905 feet per second (885 m/s); Mk XVIII : 2,874 feet per second (876 m/s)

By taking on ships being built for foreign navies in British shipyards, a number of British-built 6-inch 50-calibre naval guns found their way into British service in World War I. Their specifications and performance differed from standard Royal Navy 6-inch guns but in British service they fired standard service 100-pound projectiles.

== 6-inch Mark XIII gun ==
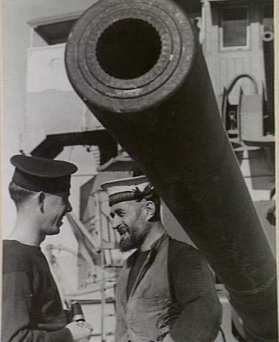
On HMS Ladybird during the Bombardment of Bardia, 31 December 1940

When World War I began, Armstrong-Whitworth were completing the battleship Sultan Osman I for the Ottoman Empire; it had originally begun as Rio de Janeiro for Brazil. Its secondary armament consisted of 20 of Armstrong-Whitworth's 6-inch 50 calibre guns, which were similar in design and characteristics to the 6-inch Mk XI gun in British service and used the same ammunition. To avoid the ship being used by Britain's enemies the battleship was seized and subsequently completed for the RN as HMS Agincourt and served in the Royal Navy in World War I. Its 6-inch guns were designated BL 6-inch Mk XIII.

Superfluous at the end of the war, Agincourt was decommissioned in 1921 and her 6-inch guns removed and used for coastal defence, and in 1939 the First World War era British gunboats Aphis and Ladybird each had their two 6-inch Mk VII guns replaced with 2 MK XIII guns, in which capacity they served in World War II.

== 6-inch Mark XIV and XV guns ==
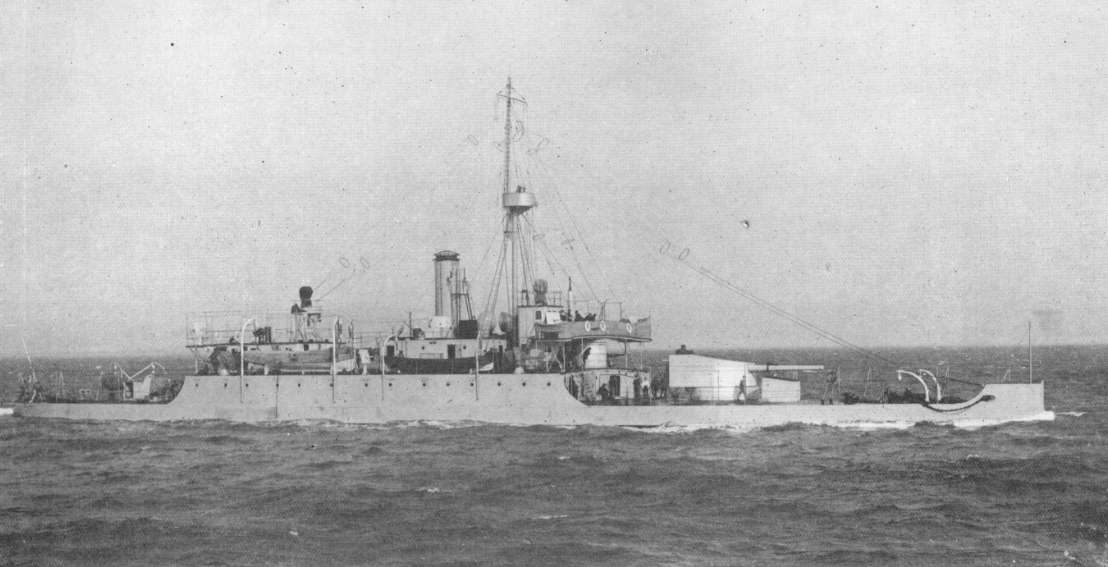
HMS Mersey early in World War I with original twin 6-inch gun turret forward

When World War I began, the Royal Navy had just taken possession of three river monitors originally built by Vickers for Brazil but which Brazil could not pay for. These were each equipped with two Vickers 6-inch 50-calibre guns in a twin turret, and became the Humber-class monitors. These guns were very similar to the British service Mk XI gun, and in UK service they were designated BL 6-inch Mk XIV for the right-hand gun in the mounting, with breech opening to the right and BL 6-inch Mk XV for the left-hand gun, with its breech opening to the left. The guns of HMS Severn and HMS Mersey wore out early in the war from continuous use first bombarding the Belgian coast and later in East Africa, and were replaced by standard 6-inch Mk VII guns, while HMS Humber continued to use various refurbished Mk XIV and XV guns throughout the war for coastal bombardment.

== 6-inch Mark XVI gun ==
At the beginning of World War I the British Government forcibly acquired the battleship Reshadieh which Vickers had just completed for the Ottoman Government. The ship entered service with the Royal Navy as HMS Erin together with its armament which while of similar calibre to British service ordnance was of differing specification. Erin had sixteen 6-inch 50 calibre guns made by Vickers, with a muzzle velocity of 3,000 feet per second (910 m/s) which was considerably greater than existing standard Royal Navy 6-inch guns. These guns were designated 6-inch BL Mark XVI in British service. Some were redeployed in World War II for coast defence.

== 6-inch Mark XVII gun ==
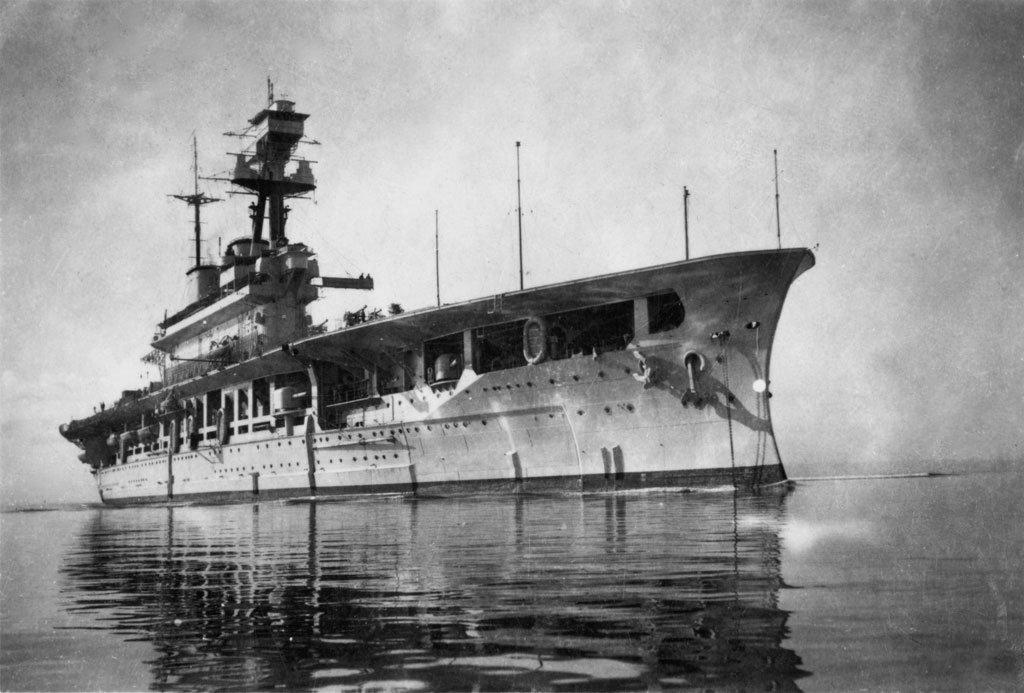
HMS Eagle in 1942 with two starboard forward 6-inch guns visible

When World War I began, Armstrong-Whitworth were building the battleships Almirante Latorre and Almirante Cochrane for Chile. They were acquired by the British government and completed as the battleship HMS Canada and the aircraft carrier HMS Eagle. The secondary armament for each supplied by Armstrongs were 12 6-inch 50-calibre guns, which were designated 6-inch BL Mk XVII in British service. These guns were used from 1915 on HMS Canada until she was sold to Chile in 1920 as originally intended. HMS Eagle was completed after World War I and retained by the Royal Navy, with these guns retained as her primary defensive armament.

== 6-inch Mark XVIII gun ==
When World War I began, Armstrong-Whitworth were building the coast defence ships Nidaros and Bjørgvin for Norway. They were acquired by the British government and completed as the monitors HMS Gorgon and HMS Glatton respectively. Their secondary armament as designed was four 15 cm (5.9 in) guns designed by Armstrongs. In Royal Navy service these guns were relined to the standard British 6-inch calibre and they were adapted to fire standard 6-inch 100-pound shells.

== Surviving Examples ==
Aft 6-inch gun displayed on HMS M.33 (at Portsmouth Historic Dockyard, UK) is from Almirante Latorre (ex-Canada) donated to the ship from Chile in 2000.

Two pieces of 6-inch mark XVII coastal defense guns are to be seen at the "Mirador Punta Angamos", close to Mejillones, Chile. Serial Numbers: No. 3308 and No. 3301

== See also ==
- List of naval guns
