= Naval history of China =

The naval history of China dates back thousands of years, with archives existing since the late Spring and Autumn period regarding the Chinese navy and the various ship types employed in wars. The Ming dynasty of China was the leading global maritime power between 1400 and 1433, when Chinese shipbuilders built massive ocean-going junks and the Chinese imperial court launched seven maritime voyages. In modern times, the governments of the current People's Republic of China and Republic of China continue to maintain standing navies through the People's Liberation Army Navy and the Republic of China Navy, respectively.

== History ==
=== Early coastal maritime endeavours ===
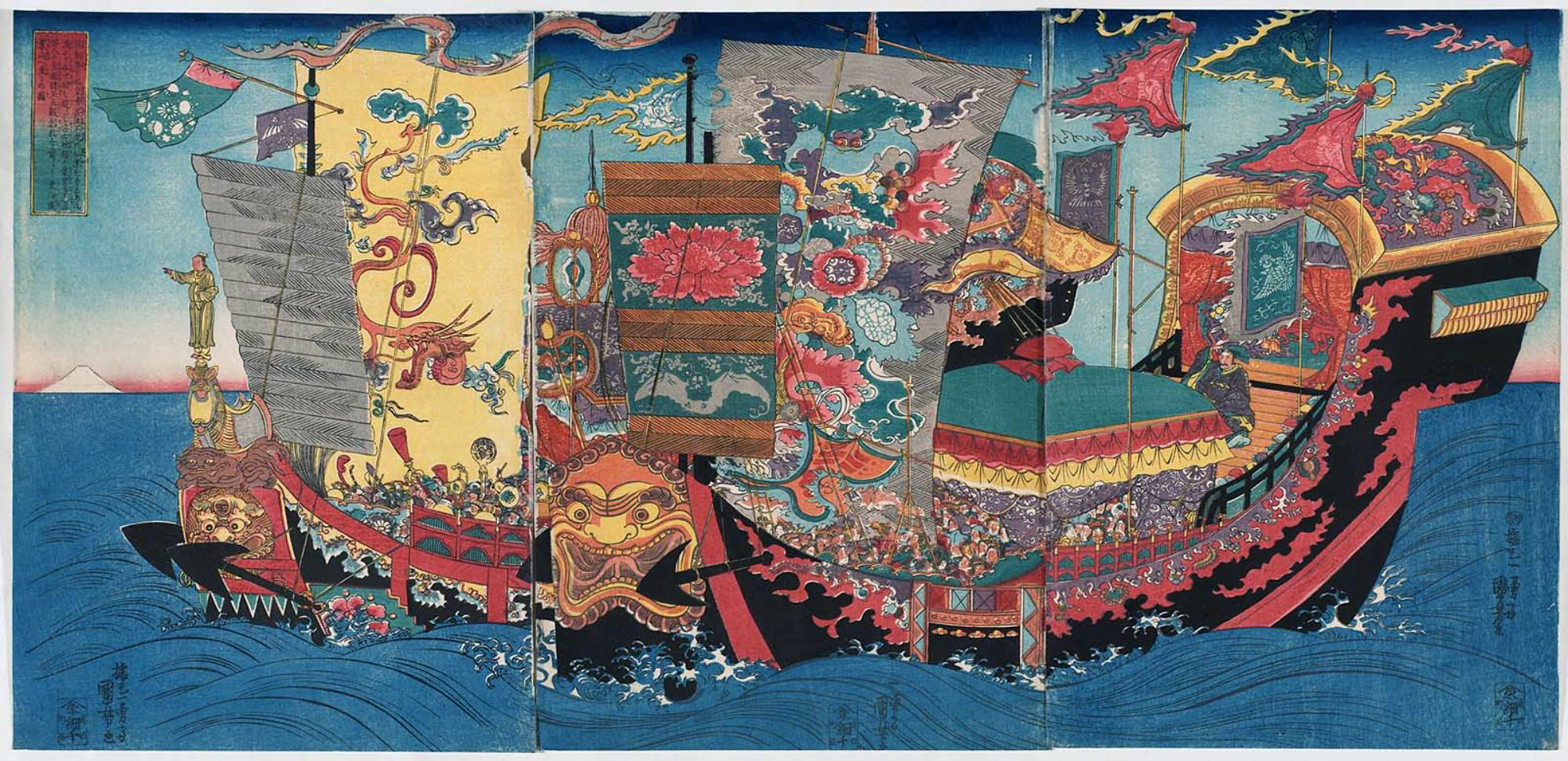
Legend: "The great ships full of boys and girls sent in search of the immortal medicine (Hôraizan) by the Chinese Emperor Shih Huang Ti (Shikôtei), c. 219 BCE". A 19th century ukiyo-e by Kuniyoshi depicting the ships of the great sea expedition sent around 219 BC by the first Chinese Emperor, Qin Shi Huang, to find the legendary home of the immortals, the Mount Penglai, and retrieve the elixir of immortality.

The Han dynasty established the first independent naval force in China, the Tower Ship Navy.

Although naval battles took place before the 12th century, such as the large-scale Three Kingdoms Battle of Chibi in the year 208, it was during the Song dynasty (960–1279) that the Chinese established a permanent, standing navy in 1132. At its height by the late 12th century there were 20 squadrons of some 52,000 marines, with the admiral's headquarters at Dinghai, while the main base remained closer to modern Shanghai.

The establishment of the first permanent Chinese navy by the Southern Song dynasty came out of the need to defend against the Jin dynasty, who had overrun the northern China, and to escort merchant fleets entering the Southeast Pacific and Indian Ocean on long trade missions abroad to the Hindu, Islamic, and East African spheres of the world. However, considering various Central Plain polities were for a long time menaced by land-based nomadic tribes such as the Xiongnu, Göktürks, Khitans and Mongols, the navy was seen as an adjunct rather than an important military force. By the 15–16th centuries China's canal system and internal economy were sufficiently developed to nullify the need for the Pacific fleet, which was scuttled when conservative Confucianists gained power in the court and began a policy of introspection. After the First and Second Opium Wars, which shook up the generals of the Qing dynasty, the government attached greater importance to the navy.

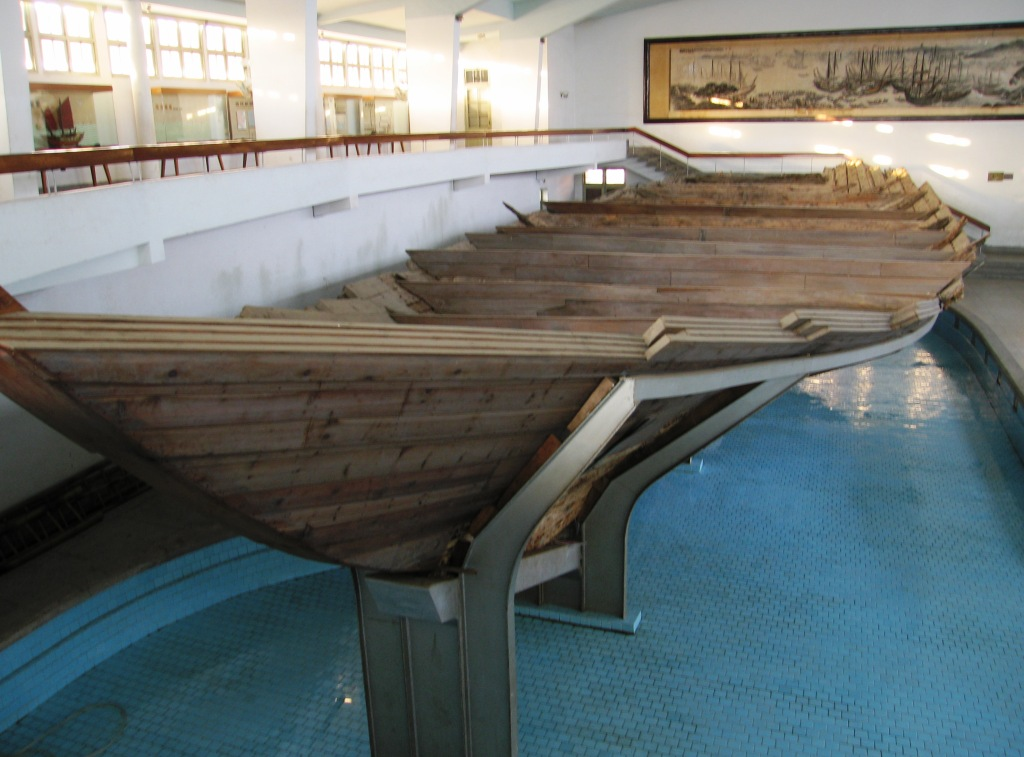
A Song dynasty junk ship, 13th century; Chinese ships of the Song period featured hulls with watertight compartments.

When the British Royal Navy encountered the Chinese during the First Opium War, their officers noted the appearance of paddle-wheel boats among the Chinese fleet, which they took to be copies of a Western design. They also discovered a nearly-complete 30-gun man-of-war in Xiamen, along with new paddle-boats and brass guns under construction in Wusong and Shanghai. Paddle-wheel boats were actually developed by the Chinese independently in the 5th–6th centuries, only a century after their first surviving mention in Roman sources (see Paddle steamer), though that method of propulsion had been abandoned for many centuries and only recently reintroduced before the war. Numerous other innovations were present in Chinese vessels during the Middle Ages that had not yet been adopted by the Western and Islamic worlds, some of which were documented by Marco Polo but were not adopted by other navies until the 18th century, when the British successfully incorporated them into ship designs. For example, medieval Chinese hulls were split into bulkhead sections so that a hull rupture only flooded a fraction of the ship and did not necessarily sink it (see Ship floodability). This was described in the book of the Song Dynasty maritime author Zhu Yu, the Pingzhou Table Talks of 1119 AD. Along with the innovations described in Zhu's book, there were many other improvements to nautical technology in the medieval Song period. These included crossbeams bracing the ribs of ships to strengthen them, rudders that could be raised or lowered to allow ships to travel in a wider range of water depths, and the teeth of anchors arranged circularly instead of in one direction, "making them more reliable". Junks also had their sails staggered by wooden poles so that the crew could raise and lower them with ropes from the deck, like window blinds, without having to climb around and tie or untie various ropes every time the ship needed to turn or adjust speed.

A significant naval battle was the Battle of Lake Poyang from August 30 to October 4 of the year 1363 AD during the Red Turban Rebellion, a battle which cemented the success of Zhu Yuanzhang in founding the Ming dynasty.

=== Ming expeditions and decline ===
After the period of maritime activity during the treasure voyages under the Yongle Emperor, the official policy towards naval expansion swayed between active restriction to ambivalence.

Despite Ming ambivalence towards naval affairs, the Chinese treasure fleet was still able to dominate other Asian navies, which enabled the Ming to send governors to rule in Luzon and Palembang as well as depose and enthrone puppet rulers in Sri Lanka and the Bataks.

However, the Chinese fleet shrank tremendously after its military/tributary/exploratory functions in the early 15th century were deemed too expensive and it became primarily a police force on routes like the Grand Canal. Ships like the juggernauts of Zheng He's "treasure fleet," which dwarfed the largest Portuguese ships of the era by several times, were discontinued, and the junk became the predominant Chinese vessel until the country's relatively recent (in terms of Chinese sailing history) naval revival.

In 1521, at the Battle of Tunmen a squadron of Ming naval junks defeated a Portuguese caravel fleet, which was followed by another Ming victory against a Portuguese fleet at the Battle of Xicaowan in 1522. In 1633, a Ming navy defeated a Dutch and Chinese pirate fleet during the Battle of Liaoluo Bay. A large number of military treatises, including extensive discussions of naval warfare, were written during the Ming period, including the Wubei Zhi and Jixiao Xinshu. Additionally, shipwrecks have been excavated in the South China Sea, including wrecks of Chinese trade and war ships that sank around 1377 and 1645.

The continuing "sea ban" policy during the early Qing dynasty meant that the development of naval power stagnated. River and coastal naval defence was the responsibility of the waterborne units of the Green Standard Army, which were based at Jingkou (now Zhenjiang) and Hangzhou.

In 1661, a naval unit was established at Jilin to defend against Russian incursions into Manchuria. Naval units were also added to various Banner garrisons subsequently, referred to collectively as the "Eight Banners Navy". In 1677, the Qing court re-established the Fujian Fleet in order to combat the Ming-loyalist Kingdom of Tungning based on Taiwan. This conflict culminated in the Qing victory the Battle of Penghu in 1683 and the surrender of the Tungning shortly after the battle. The Second Opium War showed the complete futility of the pre-modern Chinese fleet when facing modern European navies, when 300 Chinese naval junks, armed with British-made guns, did almost no damage to 56 British and French ironclads.

In the 1860s, an attempt to establish a modern navy via the British-built Osborn or "Vampire" Fleet to combat the Taiping rebels' US-built gunboats. The so-called "Vampire Fleet" fitted out by the Chinese government for the suppression of piracy on the coast of China, owing to the non-fulfilment of the condition that British commander Sherard Osborn should receive orders from the imperial government only, was scrapped.

=== Imperial Chinese Navy ===
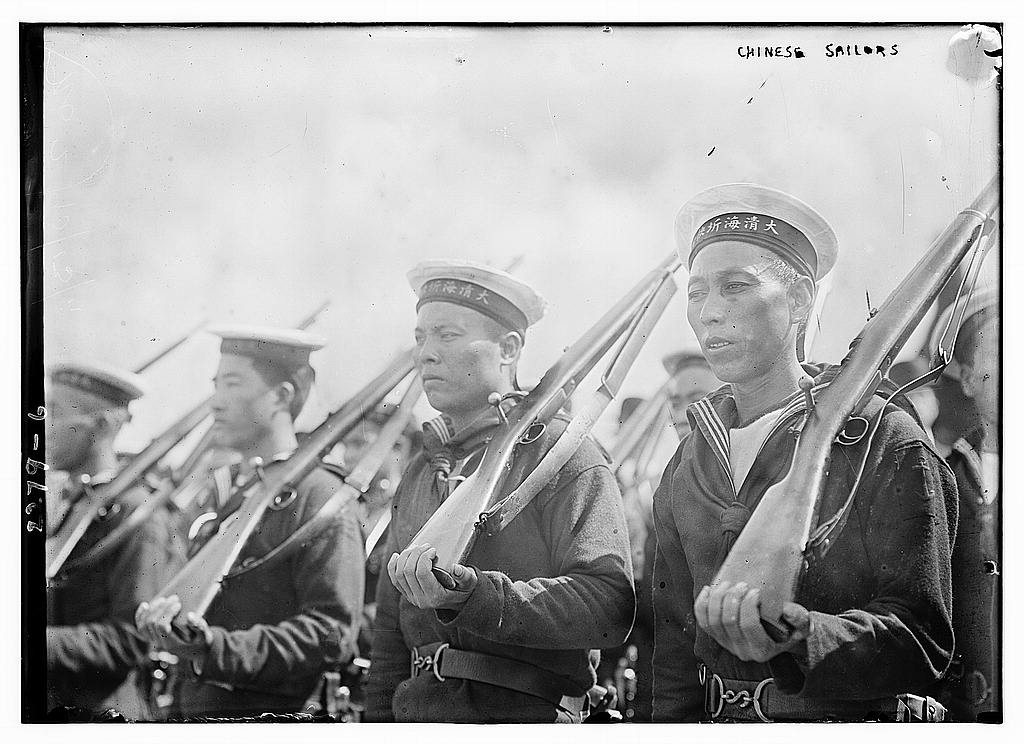
Chinese sailors from the Hai Chi, of the Imperial Chinese Navy.

There were four fleets of the Imperial Chinese Navy:

- Beiyang Fleet - North Sea Fleet based from Weihaiwei
- Nanyang Fleet - South Sea Fleet based from Shanghai
- Guangdong Fleet - based from Canton (now Guangzhou)
- Fujian Fleet - based from Fuzhou, founded in 1678 as the Fujian Marine Fleet

In 1865, the Jiangnan Shipyard was established.

In 1874, a Japanese incursion into Taiwan exposed the vulnerability of China at sea. A proposal was made to establish three modern coastal fleets: the Northern Sea or Beiyang Fleet, to defend the Yellow Sea, the Southern Sea or Nanyang Fleet, to defend the East China Sea, and the Canton Sea or Yueyang Fleet, to defend the Taiwan Strait and the South China Sea. The Beiyang Fleet, with a remit to defend the section of coastline closest to the capital Beijing, was prioritised.

A series of warships were ordered from Britain and Germany in the late 1870s, and naval bases were built at Port Arthur and Weihaiwei. The first British-built ships were delivered in 1881, and the Beiyang Fleet was formally established in 1888. Many children of Chinese military families were sent abroad to study in the United States in order to modernize the Imperial Chinese Navy, although they were denied admission to the military academies of West Point and Annapolis and had to switch to other countries after the passage of the Chinese Exclusion Act. In 1894 the Beiyang Fleet was on paper the strongest navy in Asia at the time. However, it was largely lost during the First Sino-Japanese War after the Battle of the Yalu River. This battle allowed the Imperial Japanese Army to invade China, occupy the Shandong Peninsula, and use the fortress at Weihaiwei to shell the Chinese fleet. Although the modern battleships Zhenyuan and Dingyuan were impervious to Japanese fire, they were unable to sink a single ship and all eight cruisers were lost. The battle displayed once again that the modernisation efforts of China were far inferior to the Meiji Restoration.

The Nanyang Fleet was also established in 1875, and grew with mostly domestically built warships and a small number of acquisitions from Britain and Germany. It fought in the Sino-French War, performing somewhat poorly against the French in all engagements and resulting in allowing the French colonization of Southeast Asia. The defeat of the Nanyang Fleet also emboldened the British to complete their annexation of Burma in the Third Anglo-Burmese War.

The separate Fujian and Guangdong fleets became part of the Imperial navy after 1875. The Fujian Fleet was almost annihilated during the Sino-French War, and was only able to acquire two new ships thereafter. By 1891, due to budget cuts, the Fujian Fleet was barely a viable fleet. Due to corruption much of the funds needed by the navy was taken by the Dowager Empress Cixi to renovate the Summer Palace and build her Marble Boat. The Guangdong Fleet was established in the late 1860s and based at Whampoa, in Canton (now Guangzhou). Ships from the Guangdong Fleet toured the South China Sea in 1909 as a demonstration of Chinese control over the sea.

After the First Sino-Japanese War, Zhang Zhidong established a river-based fleet in Hubei.

In 1909, the remnants of the Beiyang, Nanyang, Guangdong and Fujian Fleets, together with the Hubei fleet, were merged, and re-organised as the Sea Fleet and the River Fleet.

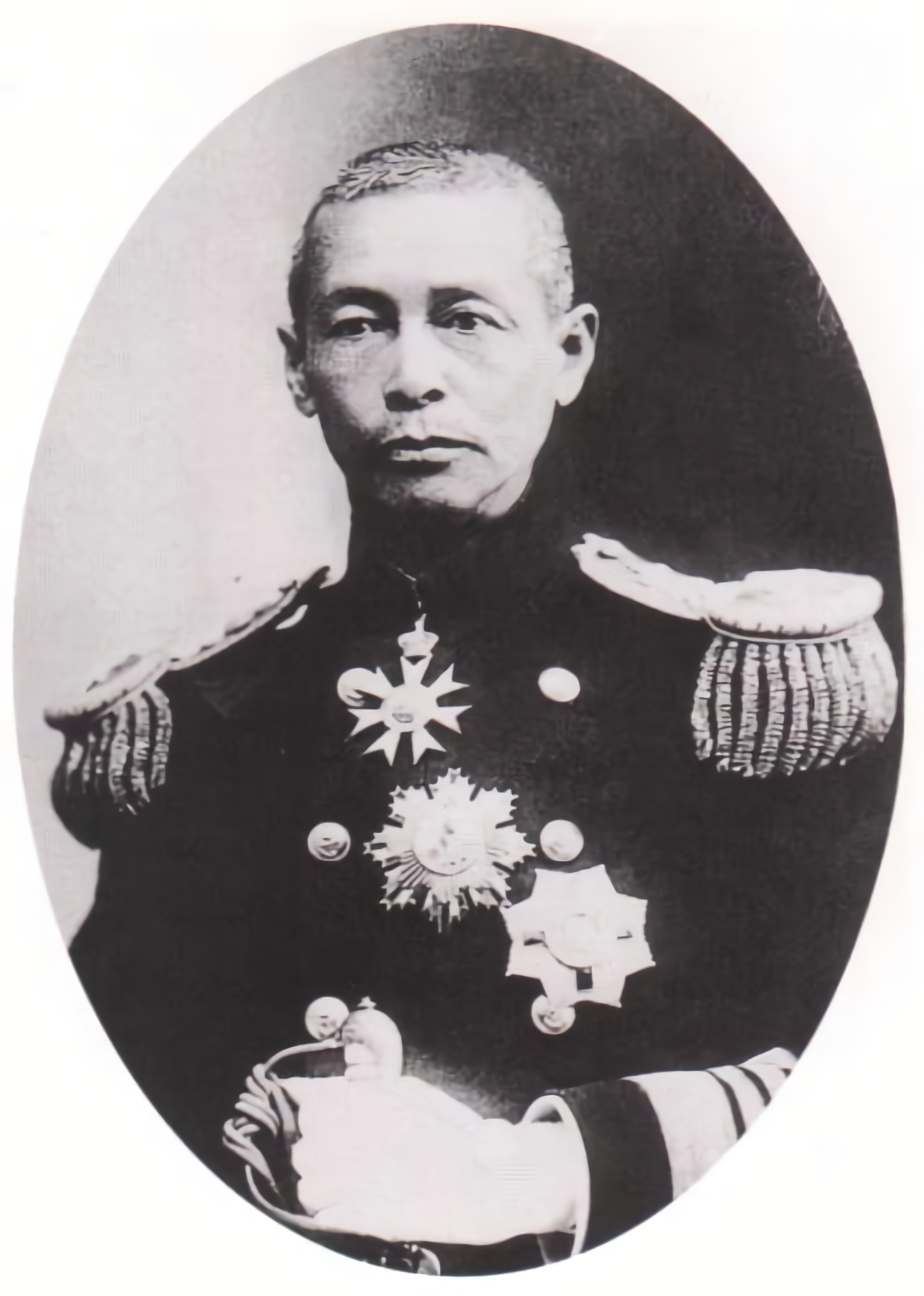
Sa Zhenbing

In 1911, Sa Zhenbing became the Minister of Navy of the Great Qing.

One of the new ships delivered after the war with Japan, the cruiser Hai Chi, in 1911 became the first vessel flying the Yellow Dragon Flag to arrive in American waters, visiting New York City as part of a tour.

=== Modern ===
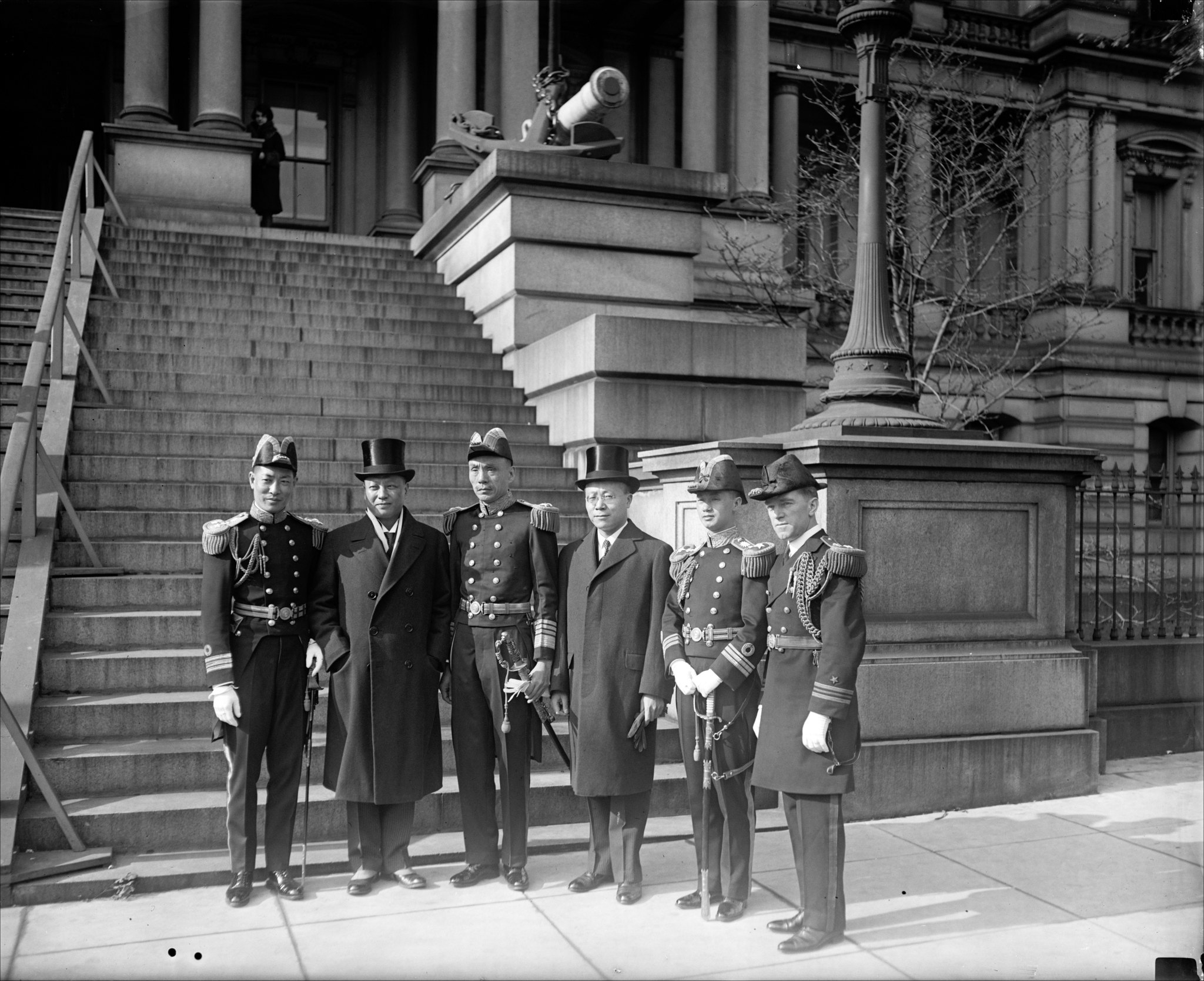
ROCN delegation in Washington D.C., 1930.

The Republic of China Navy is the navy of the Republic of China, which was established after the overthrow of the Qing dynasty. Liu Guanxiong, a former Qing dynasty admiral, became the first Minister of Navy of the Republic of China. During the Warlord Era that scarred China in the 1920s and 1930s the ROCN remained loyal to the Kuomintang government of Sun Yat-sen instead of the Beiyang government in Beijing which fell to the Nationalist government in the 1928 Northern Expedition and between the civil war with the Communist Party and 1937 Japanese invasion of Northeast China. During that time and throughout World War II, the ROCN concentrated mainly on riverine warfare as the poorly equipped ROCN was not a match to Imperial Japanese Navy over ocean or coast. The ROCN is currently the naval forces on the island of Taiwan.

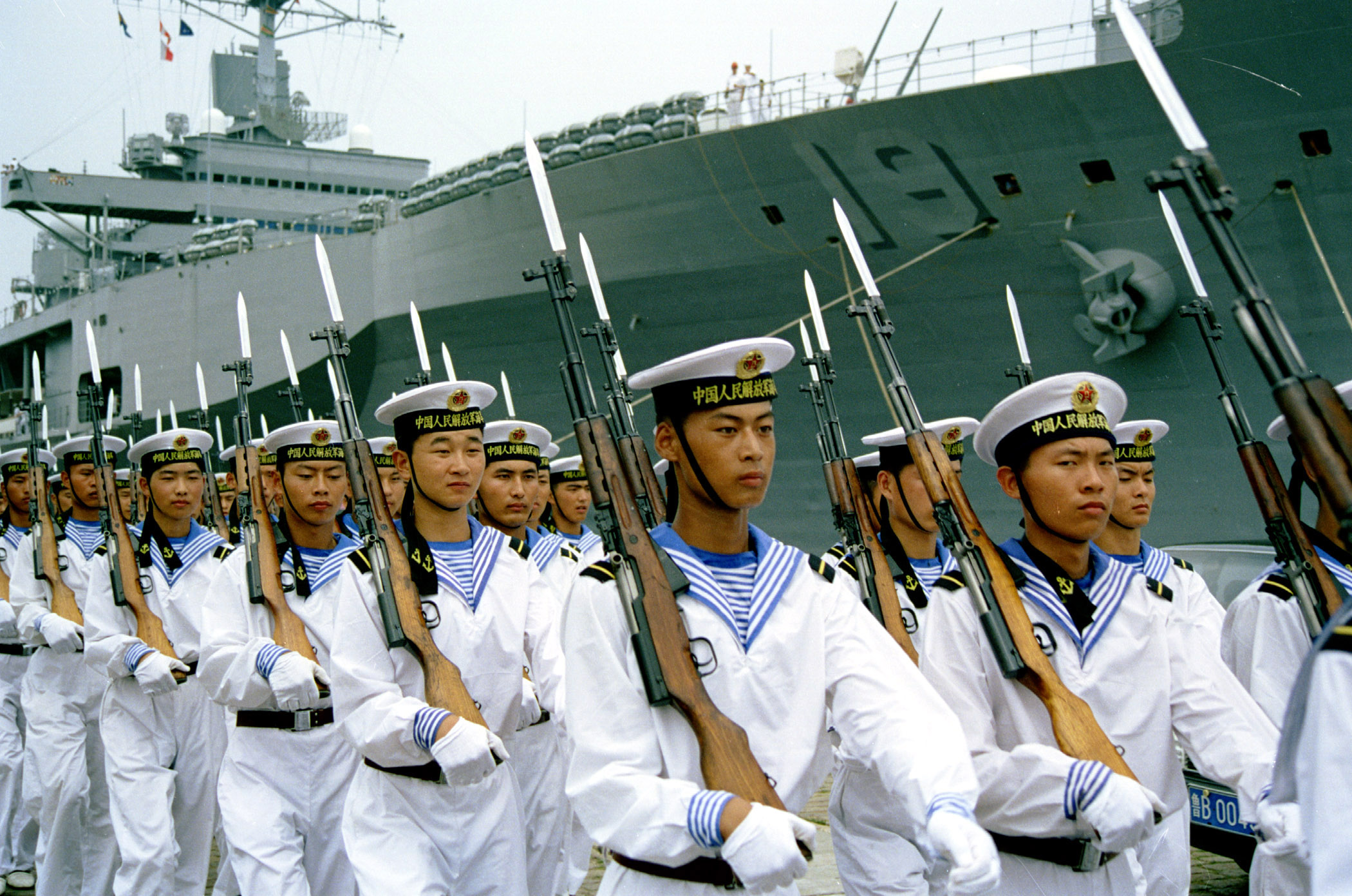
PLAN sailors at the Qingdao, North Sea Fleet headquarters parading with Type-56 carbines in 2000 for a visiting U.S. Navy delegation.

The People's Liberation Army Navy was established in 1950 for the People's Republic of China. The PLAN can trace its lineage to naval units fighting during the Chinese Civil War and was established in September 1950. The PLAN was initially dedicated to coastal defense, defending against commando raids on the Fujian coast from Taiwan. It also played a role in the First and Second Taiwan Strait Crises.

Throughout the 1950s and early 1960s, the Soviet Union provided assistance to the PLAN in the form of naval advisers and export of equipment and technology. This assistance ended after the Sino-Soviet split. Until the late 1980s, the PLAN remained largely a riverine and littoral force (brown-water navy). However, by the 1990s, following the fall of the Soviet Union and a shift towards a more forward-oriented foreign and security policy, the leaders of the Chinese military were freed from worrying over land border disputes, and instead turned their attention towards the seas. This led to the development of the People's Liberation Army Navy into a green-water navy by 2009. Before the 1990s the PLAN had traditionally played a subordinate role to the People's Liberation Army Ground Force.

In 2020 the PLAN surpassed the U.S. Navy as the largest navy in the world in numbers of ships, although the U.S. Navy continued to have technological advantages. This development occurred amid increasing tensions between China and the United States and as China was becoming involved in territorial disputes in the South China Sea.

== Literature ==
=== Early literature ===
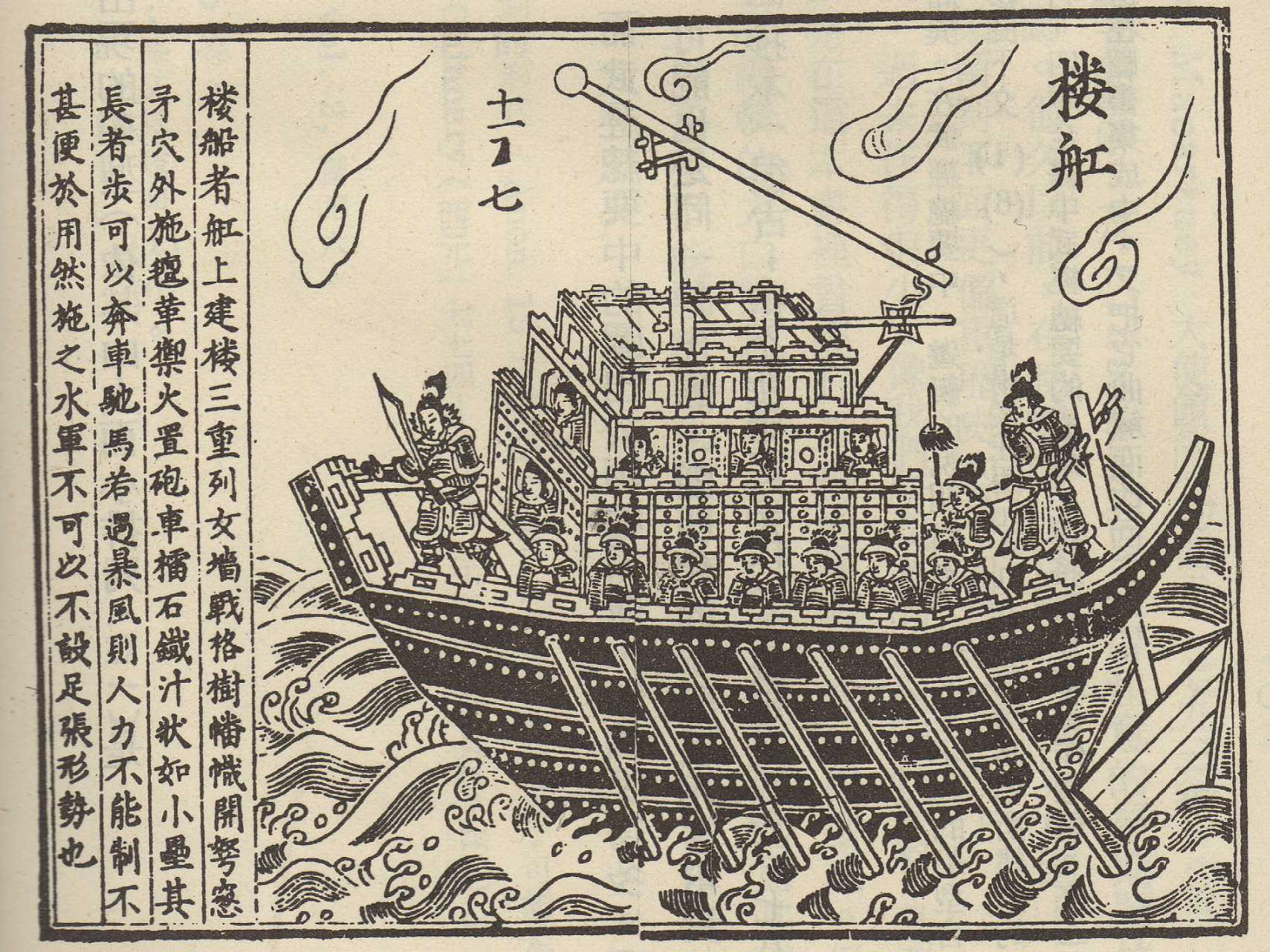
A Chinese Song dynasty naval river ship with a Xuanfeng traction-trebuchet catapult on its top deck, taken from an illustration of the Wujing Zongyao (1044 AD).

One of the oldest known Chinese books written on naval matters was the Yuejueshu (Lost Records of the State of Yue) of 52 AD, attributed to the Han dynasty scholar Yuan Kang. Many passages of Yuan Kang's book were rewritten and published in Li Fang's Imperial Reader of the Taiping Era, compiled in AD 983. The preserved written passages of Yuan Kang's book were again featured in the Yuanjian Leihan (Mirror of the Infinite, a Classified Treasure Chest) encyclopedia, edited and compiled by Zhang Ying in 1701 during the Qing dynasty.

Yuan Kang's book listed various water crafts that were used for war, including one that was used primarily for ramming like Phoenician triremes. These "classes" of ships were the great wing (da yi), the little wing (xiao yi), the stomach striker (tu wei), the castle ship (lou chuan), and the bridge ship (qiao chuan). These were listed in the Yuejueshu as a written dialogue between King Helü of Wu (r. 514 BC–496 BC) and Wu Zixu (526 BC–484 BC). The Wu Kingdom's Navy is regarded as the origin of the first Chinese Navy which consisted of different ships for specific purposes. Wu Zixu stated:

Nowadays in training naval forces we use the tactics of land forces for the best effect. Thus great wing ships correspond to the army's heavy chariots, little wing ships to light chariots, stomach strikers to battering rams, castle ships to mobile assault towers, and bridge ships to light cavalry.

Ramming vessels were also attested to in other Chinese documents, including the Shi Ming dictionary of c. 100 AD written by Liu Xi. The Chinese also used a large iron t-shaped hook connected to a spar to pin retreating ships down, as described in the Mozi book compiled in the 4th century BC. This was discussed in a dialogue between Mozi and Lu Ban in 445 BC (when Lu traveled to the State of Chu from the State of Lu), as the hook-and-spar technique made standard on all Chu warships was given as the reason why the Yue navy lost in battle to Chu.

The rebellion of Gongsun Shu in Sichuan province against the re-established Han dynasty during the year 33 AD was recorded in the Book of Later Han, compiled by Fan Ye in the 5th century. Gongsun sent a naval force of some twenty to thirty thousand soldiers down the Yangtze River to attack the position of the Han commander Cen Peng. After Cen Peng defeated several of Gongsun's officers, Gongsun had a long floating pontoon bridge constructed across the Yangtze with fortified posts on it, protected further by a boom, as well as erecting forts on the river bank to provide further missile fire at another angle. Cen Peng was unable to break through this barrier and barrage of missile fire, until he equipped his navy with castle ships, rowed assault vessels, and 'colliding swoopers' used for ramming in a fleet of several thousand vessels and quelled Gongsun's rebellion.

A Chinese paddle-wheel driven ship from a Qing dynasty encyclopedia published in 1726.

The 'castle ship' design described by Yuan Kang saw continued use in Chinese naval battles after the Han period. Confronting the navy of the Chen dynasty on the Yangtze River, Emperor Wen of Sui (r. 581–604) employed an enormous naval force of thousands of ships and 518,000 soldiers stationed along the Yangtze (from Sichuan to the Pacific Ocean). The largest of these ships had five layered decks, could hold 800 passengers, and each ship was fitted with six 50 ft. long booms that were used to swing and damage enemy ships, along with the ability of pinning them down.

== Vessels of the Tang dynasty ==
During the Chinese Tang dynasty (618–907 AD) there were some famous naval engagements, such as the Tang-Silla victory over the Korean kingdom of Baekje and Yamato Japanese forces in the Battle of Baekgang in 663. Tang dynasty literature on naval warfare and ship design became more nuanced and complex. In his Taipai Yinjing (Canon of the White and Gloomy Planet of War) of 759 AD, Li Quan gave descriptions for several types of naval ships in his day (note: multiple-deck castle ships are referred to as tower ships below). Not represented here are the paddle-wheel crafts innovated by the Tang Prince Li Gao more than a decade later in 784 AD. Paddle-wheel craft would continue to hold an important place in the Chinese navy. Along with gunpowder bombs, paddle-wheel craft were a significant reason for the success in the later Song dynasty naval victory of the Battle of Caishi in the year 1161 AD during the Jin–Song wars.

=== Covered swoopers ===
Covered swoopers (Meng chong, 蒙衝); these are ships which have their backs roofed over and (armored with) a covering of rhinoceros hide. Both sides of the ship have oar-ports; and also both fore and aft, as well as to port and starboard, there are openings for crossbows and holes for spears. Enemy parties cannot board (these ships), nor can arrows or stones injure them. This arrangement is not adopted for large vessels because higher speed and mobility are preferable, in order to be able to swoop suddenly on the unprepared enemy. Thus these (covered swoopers) are not fighting ships (in the ordinary sense).

=== Combat junks ===
Combat junks (Zhan xian); combat junks have ramparts and half-ramparts above the side of the hull, with the oar-ports below. Five feet from the edge of the deck (to port and starboard) there is set a deckhouse with ramparts, having ramparts above it as well. This doubles the space available for fighting. There is no cover or roof over the top (of the ship). Serrated pennants are flown from staffs fixed at many places on board, and there are gongs and drums; thus these (combat junks) are (real) fighting ships (in the ordinary sense).

=== Flying barques ===
Flying barques (Zou ge); another kind of fighting ship. They have a double row of ramparts on the deck, and they carry more sailors (lit. rowers) and fewer soldiers, but the latter are selected from the best and bravest. These ships rush back and forth (over the waves) as if flying, and can attack an enemy unawares. They are most useful for emergencies and urgent duty.

=== Patrol boats ===
Patrol boats (Yu ting) are small vessels used for collecting intelligence. They have no ramparts above the hull, but to port and starboard there is one rowlock every four feet, varying in total number according to the size of the boat. Whether going forward, stopping, or returning, or making evolutions in formation, the speed (of these boats) is like flying. But they are for reconnaissance, they are not fighting boats/ships.

=== Sea hawks ===
Sea hawks (Hai hu); these ships have low bows and high sterns, the forward parts (of the hull) being small and the after parts large, like the shape of the hu bird (when floating on the water). Below deck level, both to port and starboard, there are 'floating-boards' (fou ban) shaped like the wings of the hu bird. These help the (sea hawk) ships, so that even when wind and wave arise in fury, they are neither (driven) sideways, nor overturn. Covering over and protecting the upper parts on both sides of the ship are stretched raw ox-hides, as if on a city wall [a footnote: protection against incendiary projectiles]. There are serrated pennants, and gongs and drums, just as on the fighting ships.

== Ships from the Wujing Zongyao ==
A "tower" ship with a traction-trebuchet on its top deck, from the Wujing Zongyao

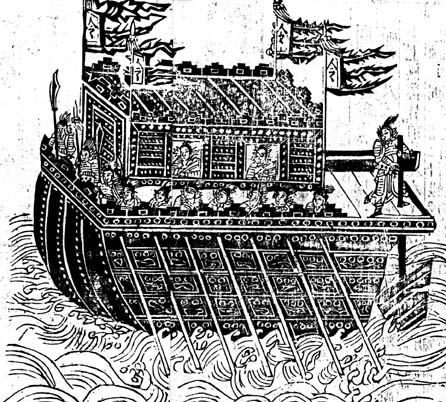
A "combat" ship from the Wujing Zongyao

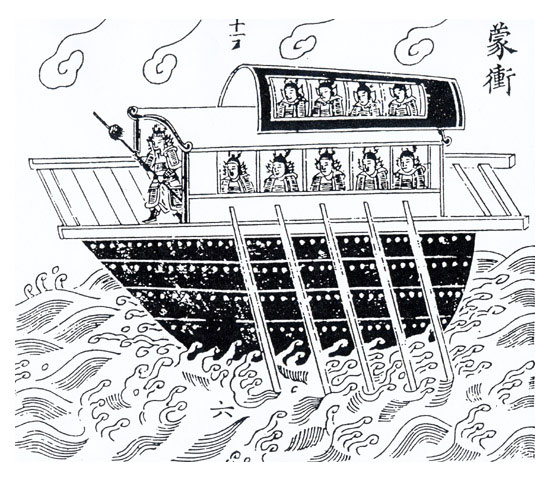
A "covered assault" ship from the Wujing Zongyao

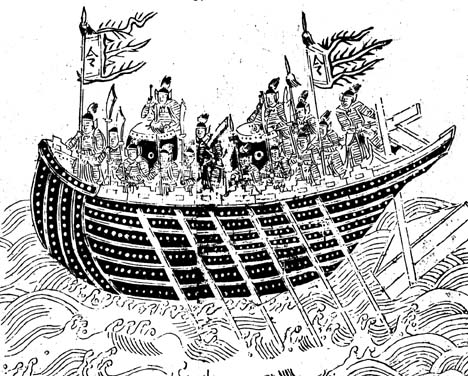
A "flying" barque from the Wujing Zongyao

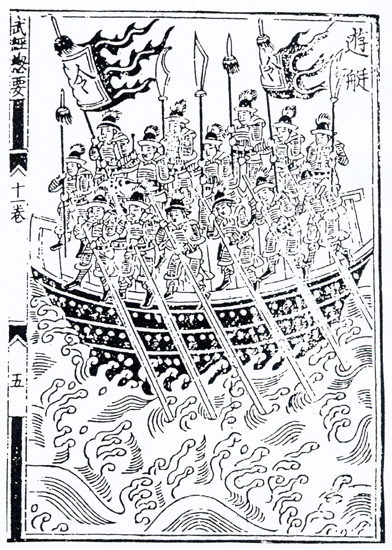
A "patrol" boat from the Wujing Zongyao

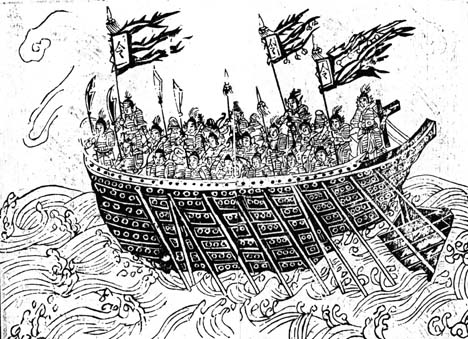
A "sea hawk" ship from the Wujing Zongyao

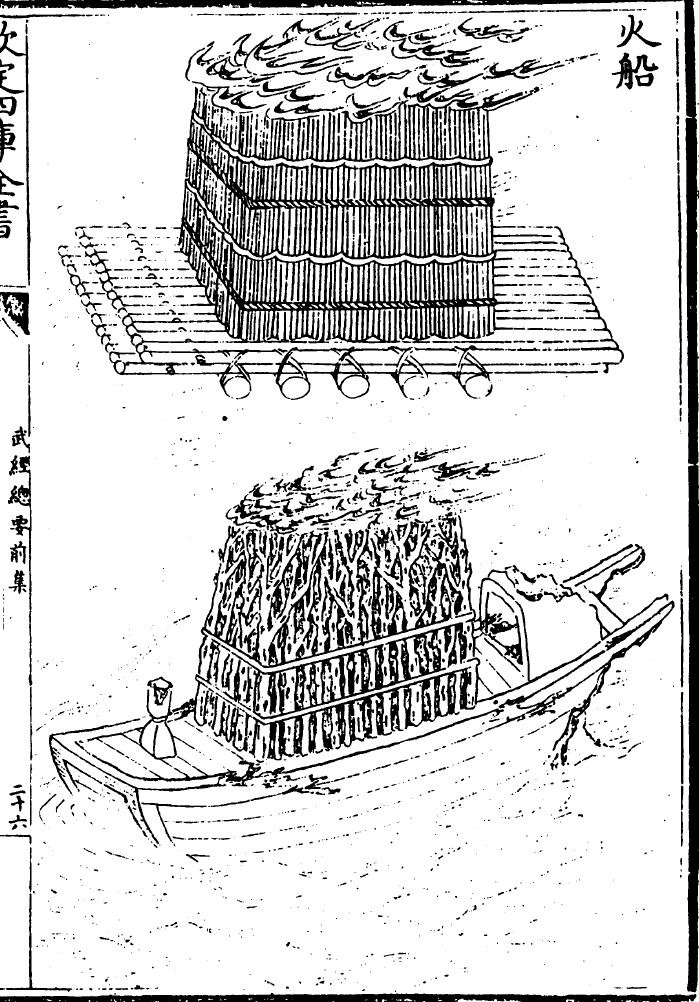
Chinese fire ships from the Wujing Zongyao

== Naval endeavours by era ==
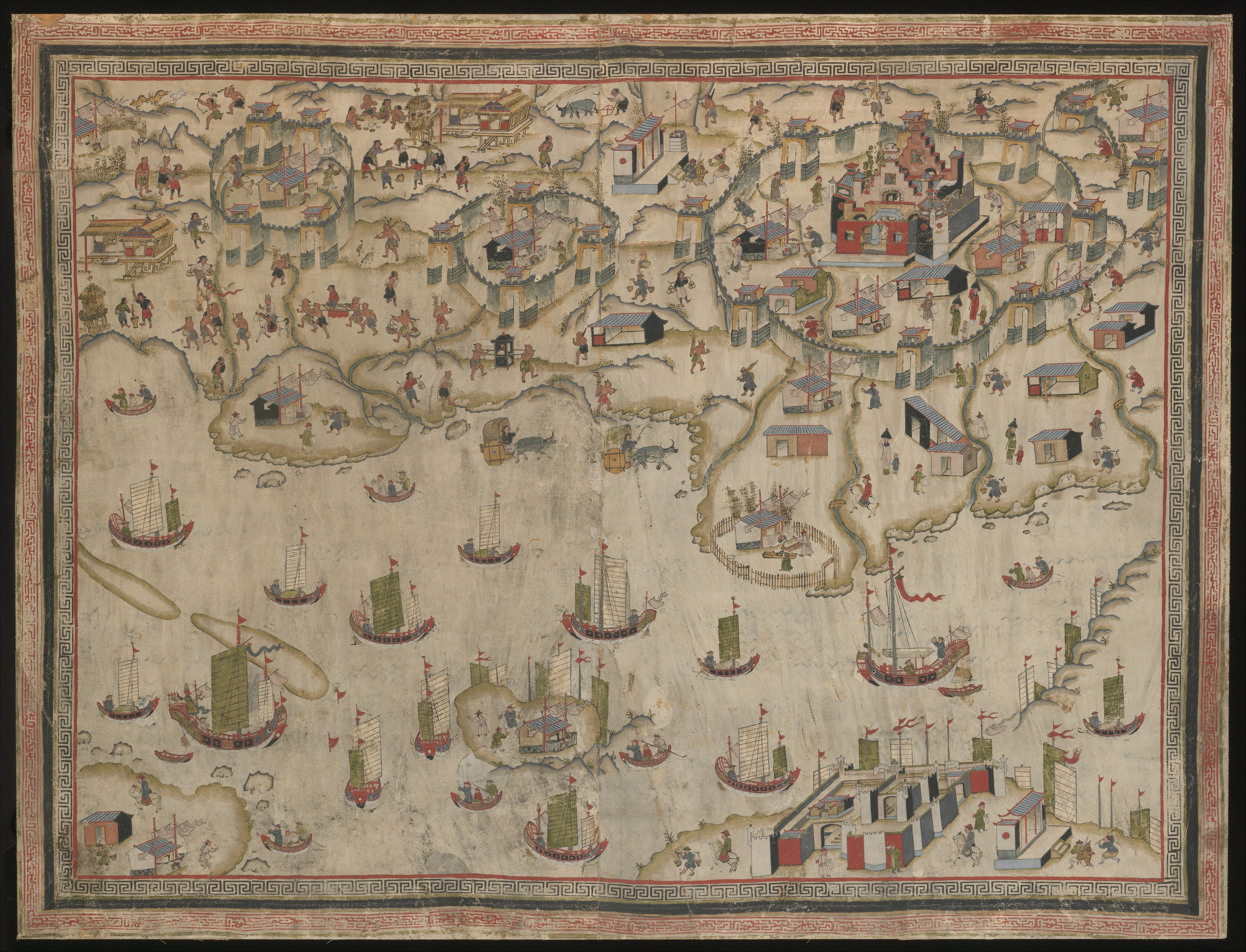
Fort Zeelandia in the 19th century, Qing dynasty

=== Spring and Autumn period ===
- Wars between Wu and Qi

=== Warring States ===
- Wars between Yue and Chu

=== Qin dynasty ===
- Xu Fu
- Tu Sui (屠睢) Conquered Baiyue

=== Han dynasty ===
- 111 BCE, the delegates of Emperor Wu of Han explored Southeast Asia and India from the Gulf of Tonkin to make contact with central Asia states, the Silk Road of the Sea.
- Rebellion of Gongsun Shu
- Battle of Jiangxia
- Battle of Red Cliffs
- Battle of Ruxu (217)

=== Three Kingdoms ===
- Battle of Dongkou
- Battle of Jiangling (223)
- Battle of Ruxu (222–223)

=== Sui dynasty ===
- Goguryeo-Sui Wars

=== Tang dynasty ===
- Battle of Baekgang

=== Song dynasty ===
- Battle of Caishi
- Battle of Tangdao
- Battle of Xiangyang
- Battle of Yamen

=== Yuan dynasty ===
- Third Battle of Bạch Đằng
- First Battle of Hakata Bay
- Battle of Kōan
- Java Expedition

=== Ming dynasty ===
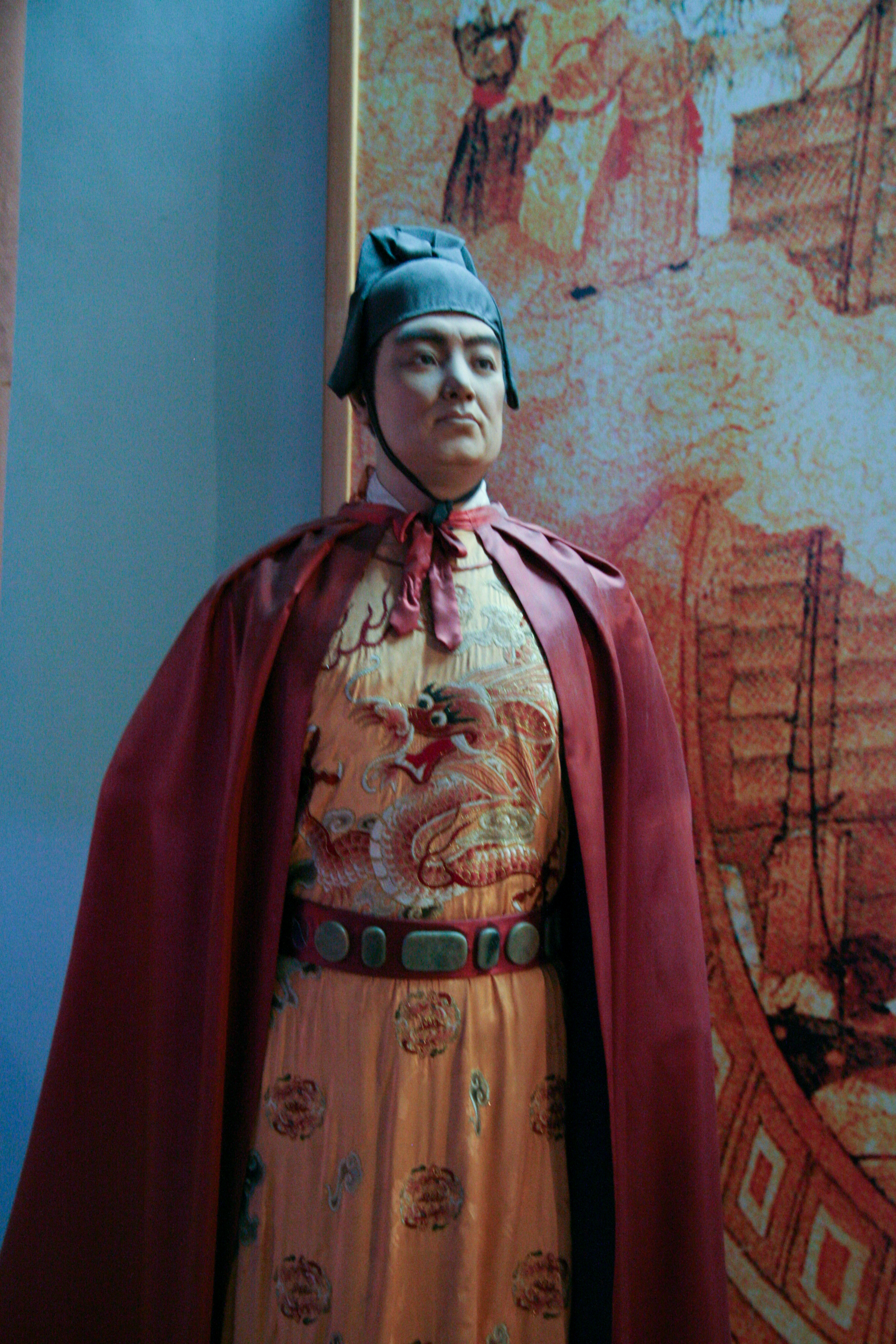
A modern wax statue of Admiral Zheng He, who led seven expeditions in the Western Ocean

- Battle of Lake Poyang
- Ming treasure voyages led by Zheng He
- Wokou
  - Jiajing wokou raids
- Imjin War
  - Battle of Noryang
- First Battle of Tamao
- Second Battle of Tamao
- Battle of Penghu (1624)
- Battle of Liaoluo Bay
- Siege of Fort Zeelandia

=== Qing dynasty ===
The Qing established a sea defence force of 7 fleets across 4 sea zones. Due to rebellions in the late 18th century the navy was neglected and declined, ultimately suffering defeat in the Opium Wars.

The modern Imperial Chinese Navy was established in 1875, prompted by a Japanese incursion into Taiwan that exposed the vulnerability of the existing, pre-modern Chinese navy. Numerous modern ships equipped with Krupp guns, electricity, gatling guns, torpedoes, and other modern weapons were acquired by the Qing dynasty from western powers. They were manned by western trained Chinese officers.

- Zheng Chengong
- Battle of Penghu
- Beiyang Fleet
- Nanyang Fleet
- Fujian Fleet
- Guangdong Fleet
- First and Second Opium Wars
- Sino-French War
  - Battle of Foochow
  - Battle of Shipu
- First Sino-Japanese War
  - Battle of Yalu River (1894)
  - Battle of Weihaiwei

=== Republic of China ===
- Republic of China Navy
- Second Sino-Japanese War
- Battle of Wuhan
- Landing Operation on Hainan Island
- First Taiwan Strait Crisis
- Second Taiwan Strait Crisis
- Third Taiwan Strait Crisis

=== People's Republic of China ===
- People's Liberation Army Navy
- First Taiwan Strait Crisis
- Second Taiwan Strait Crisis
- Battle of the Paracel Islands
- Third Taiwan Strait Crisis
- Spratly Island Skirmish (1988)

== Chinese naval warfare gallery ==
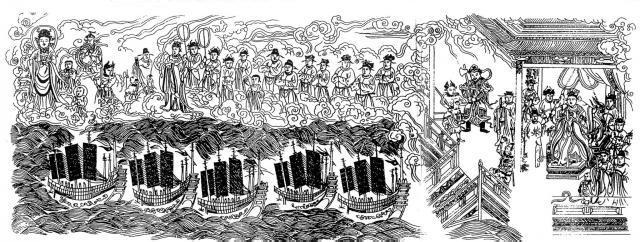
A restored copy of the illustration of Zheng He's visits to the West on the flyleaf of the book "Heavenly Princess Classics" in 1420. This invaluable picture is the earliest pictorial record of Zheng He treasure-ships.

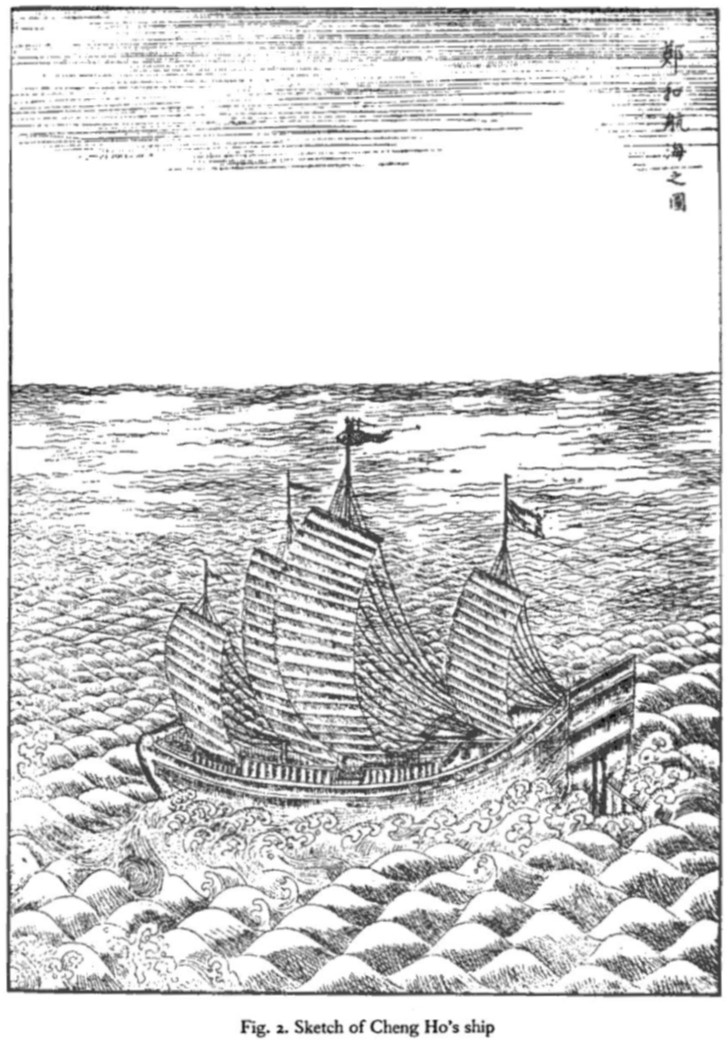
Sketch of Cheng Ho's ship

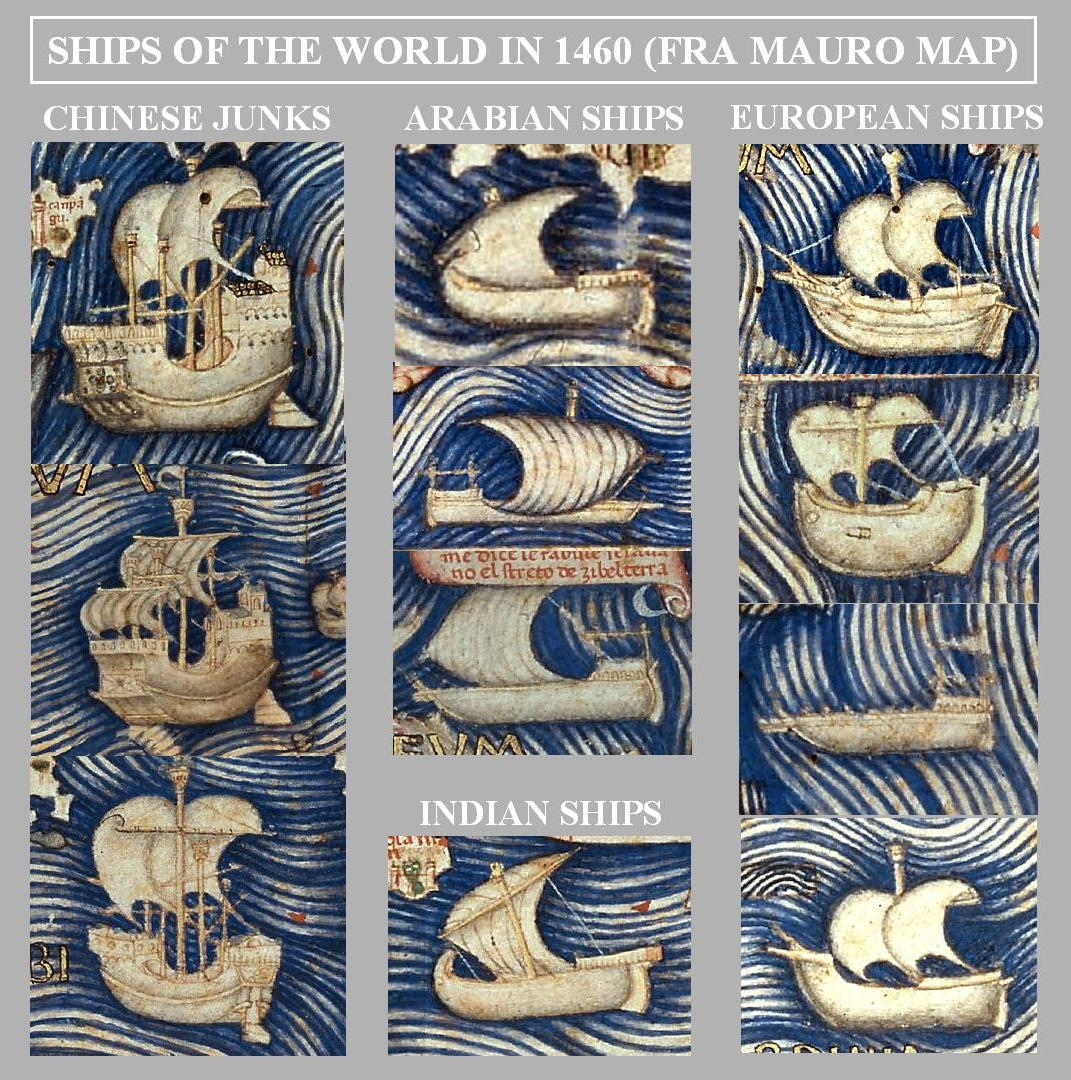
Ships of the world as depicted in the Fra Mauro map, 1460.

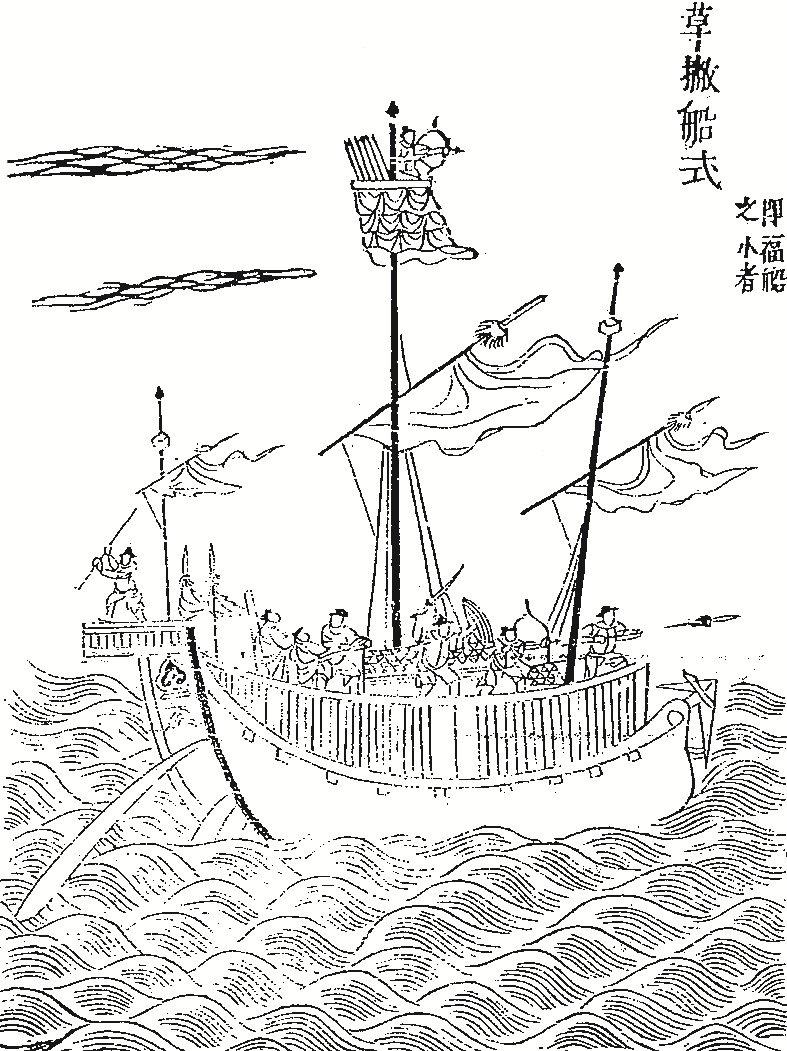
Ming dynasty war junk from Zheng Ruozeng's Chouhai tubian (1562)

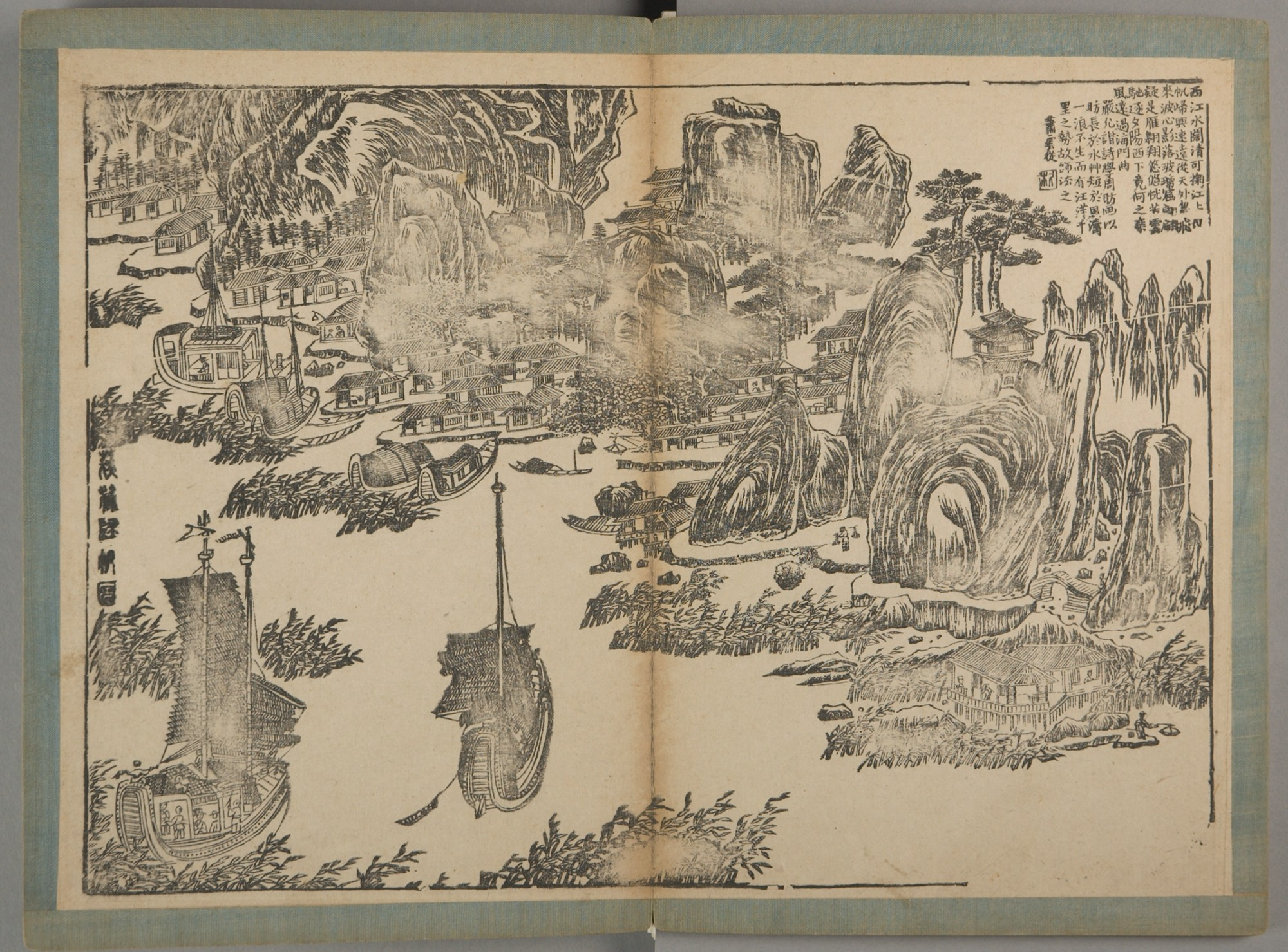
River ships in Taiping Shanshui tu by Xiao Yuncong (1596-1673)

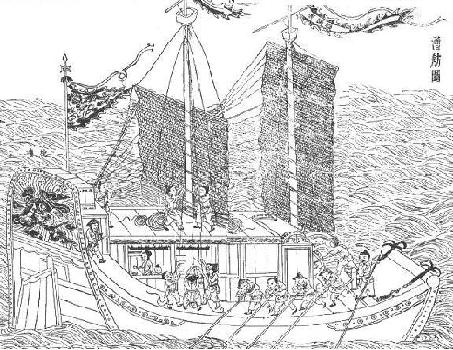
A two-masted Chinese junk, from the Tiangong Kaiwu of Song Yingxing, published in 1637

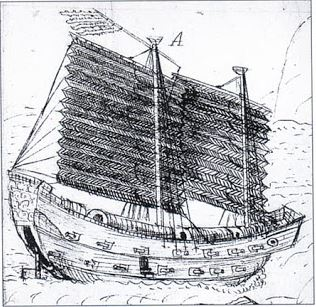
A Ming junk, 1637.

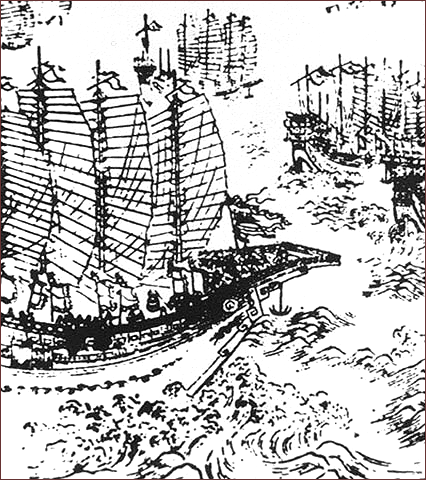
Early 17th-century Chinese woodblock print, thought to represent Zheng He's ships

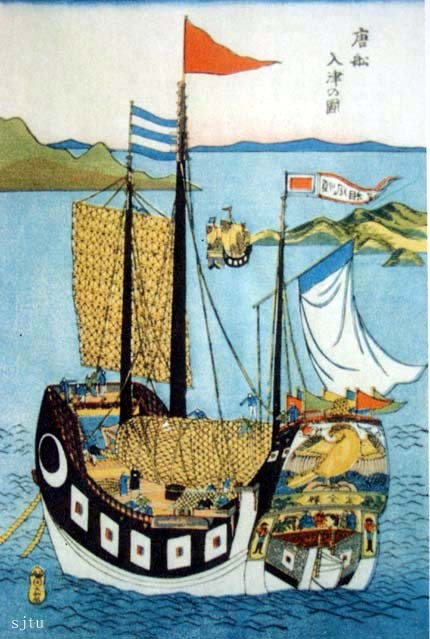
A Chinese junk in Japan, at the beginning of the Sakoku period (1644–1648 Japanese woodblock print)

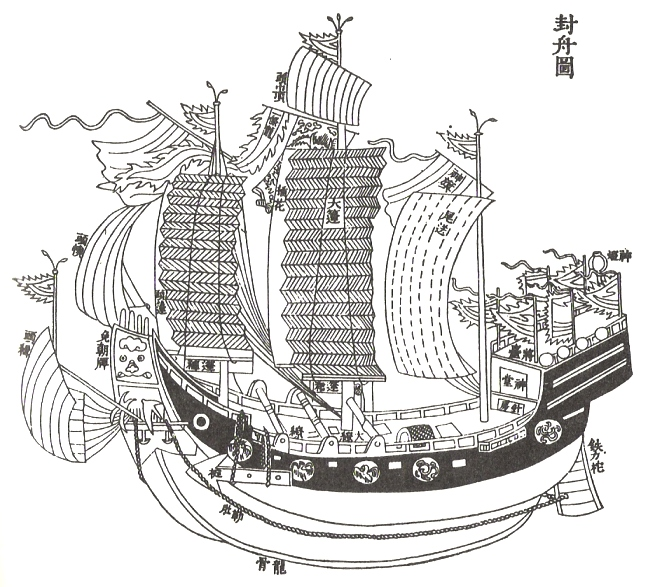
Ming-Qing ship (Feng Zhou) from the Liuqiu guozhi lüe (The History of the Ryukyu Kingdom), 1759.

Barge, Gujin Tushu Jicheng

Covered swooper, Gujin Tushu Jicheng

Walking barge, Gujin Tushu Jicheng

Fighting ship, Gujin Tushu Jicheng

Sea falcon ship, Gujin Tushu Jicheng

Guangdong ship, Gujin Tushu Jicheng

Xinhui sharp tail ship, Gujin Tushu Jicheng

Dongguan great head ship, Gujin Tushu Jicheng

Great fortune ship, Gujin Tushu Jicheng

Grass ship, Gujin Tushu Jicheng

Haicang ship, Gujin Tushu Jicheng

Wave breaking ship, Gujin Tushu Jicheng

High branch ship, Gujin Tushu Jicheng

Sound ship, Gujin Tushu Jicheng

Leather bridge ship, Gujin Tushu Jicheng

Cangshan ship, Gujin Tushu Jicheng

Eight oar ship, Gujin Tushu Jicheng

Falcon ship, Gujin Tushu Jicheng

Fishing ship, Gujin Tushu Jicheng

Netting ship, Gujin Tushu Jicheng

Two headed ship, Gujin Tushu Jicheng

Sand ship, Gujin Tushu Jicheng

Centipede ship, Gujin Tushu Jicheng

Beak ship, Gujin Tushu Jicheng

Son and mother boat, Gujin Tushu Jicheng

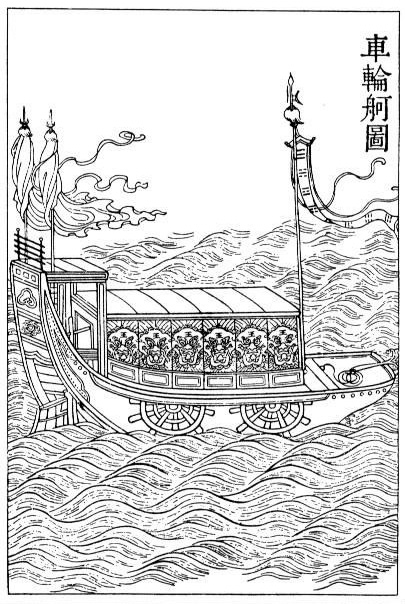
Wheel barge, Gujin Tushu Jicheng

Red dragon boat, Gujin Tushu Jicheng

Fire ship, Gujin Tushu Jicheng

Bomb laying boat, Gujin Tushu Jicheng

Tower ship, Gujin Tushu Jicheng

Junk Keying travelled from China to the United States and England between 1846 and 1848.

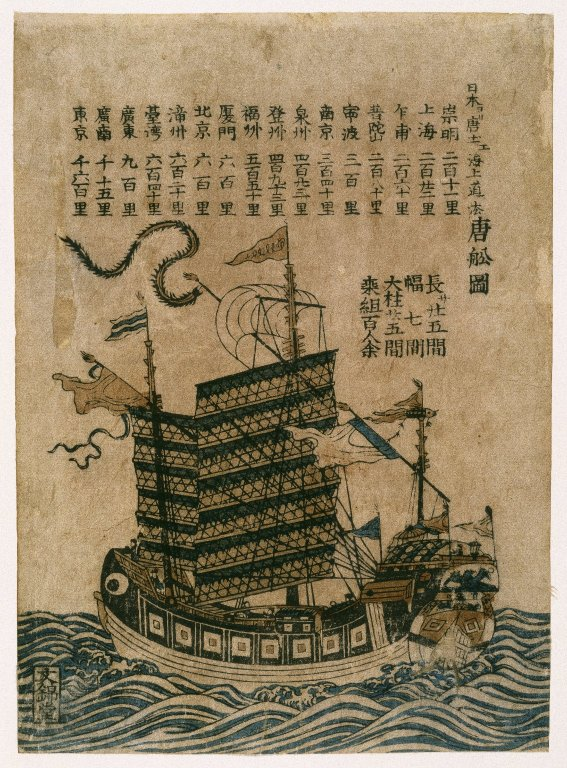
Chinese ship, 1853.

Either the Chinese frigate Haian or Yuyuen, of the Imperial Chinese Navy.

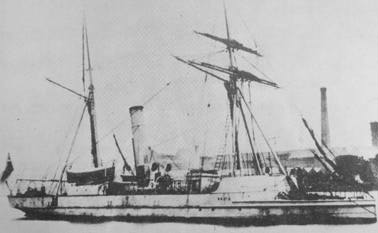
Chinese gunboat Cedian, of the Imperial Chinese Navy.

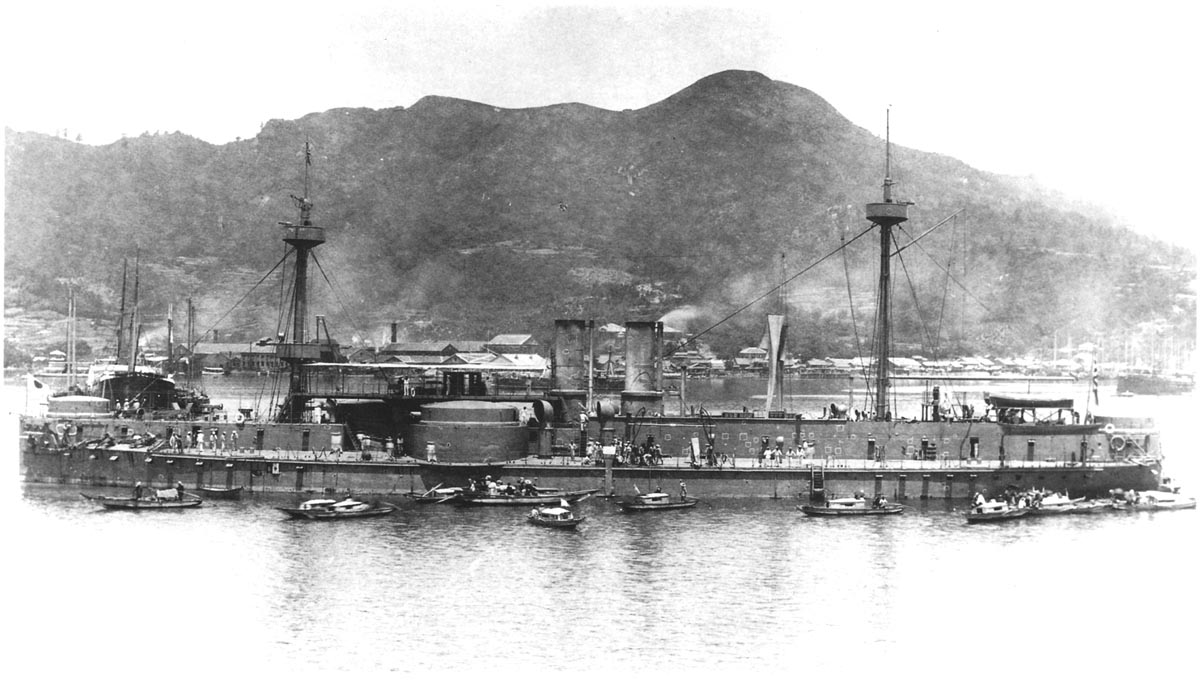
The Chinese ironclad Zhenyuan, of the Imperial Chinese Navy.

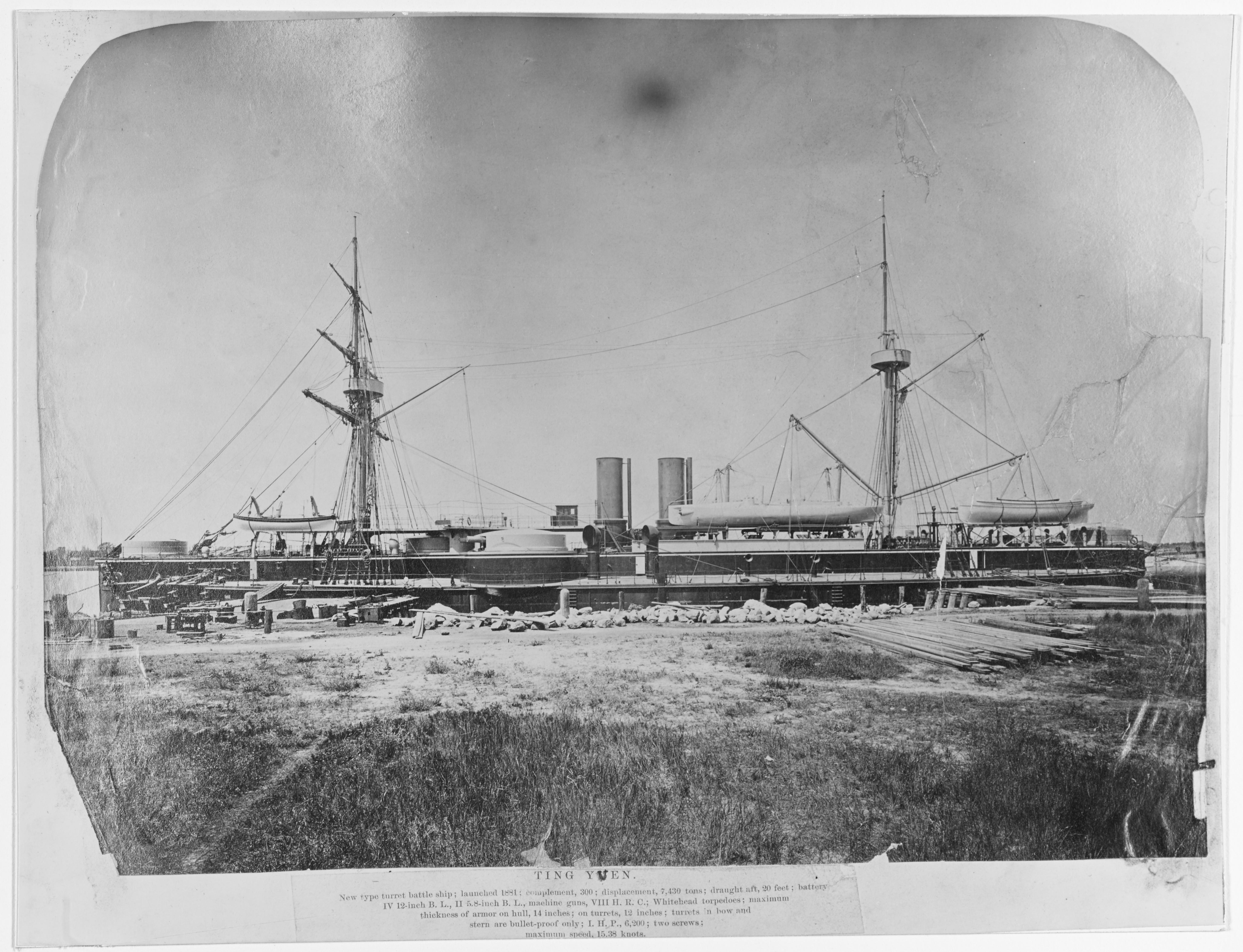
The Chinese ironclad Dingyuan, of the Imperial Chinese Navy.

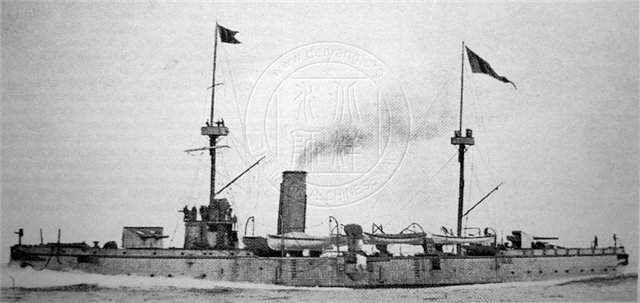
The Chinese cruiser Zhiyuan, of the Imperial Chinese Navy.

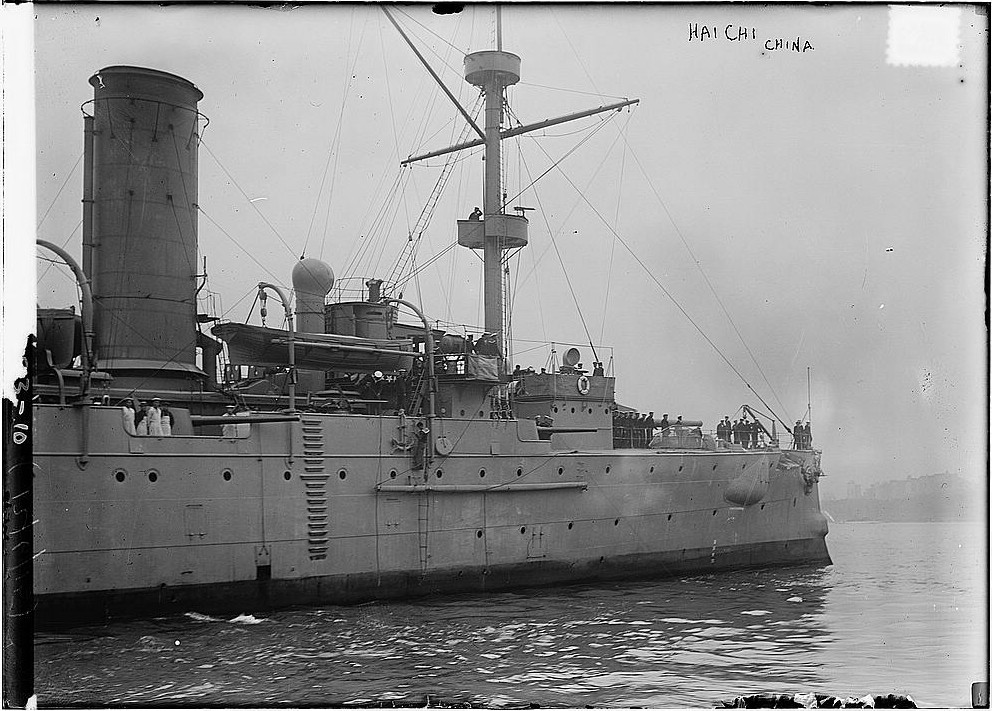
The Chinese cruiser Hai Chi, of the Imperial Chinese Navy.

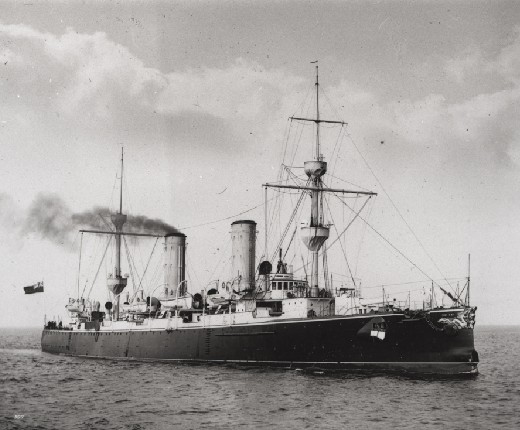
The Chinese cruiser Hai Tien, of the Imperial Chinese Navy.

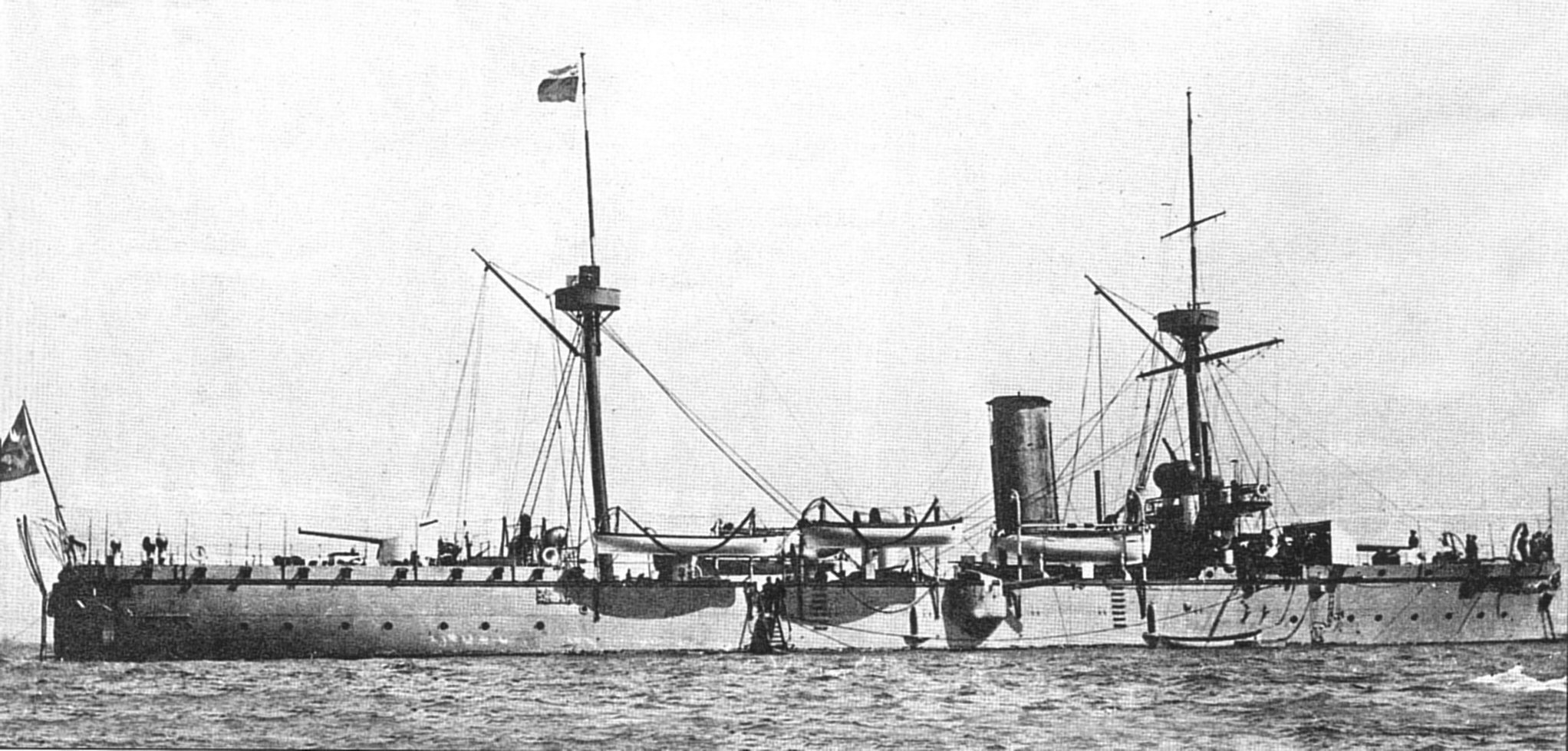
The Chinese cruiser Jingyuan (靖遠), of the Imperial Chinese Navy.

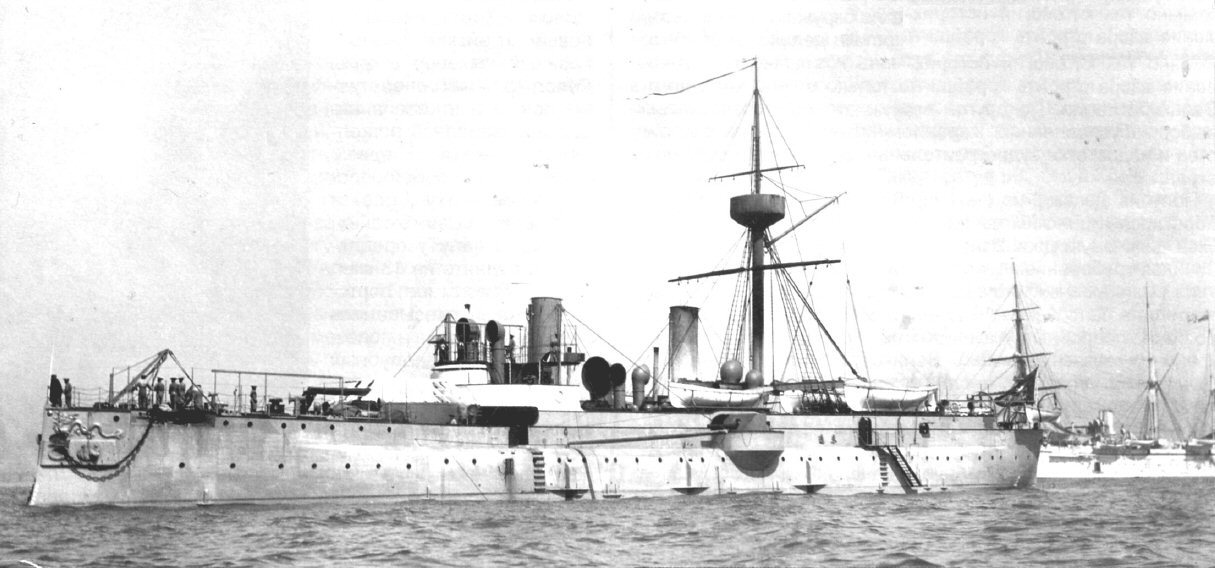
The Chinese cruiser Jingyuan (經遠), of the Imperial Chinese Navy.

The Chinese cruiser Laiyuan, of the Imperial Chinese Navy.

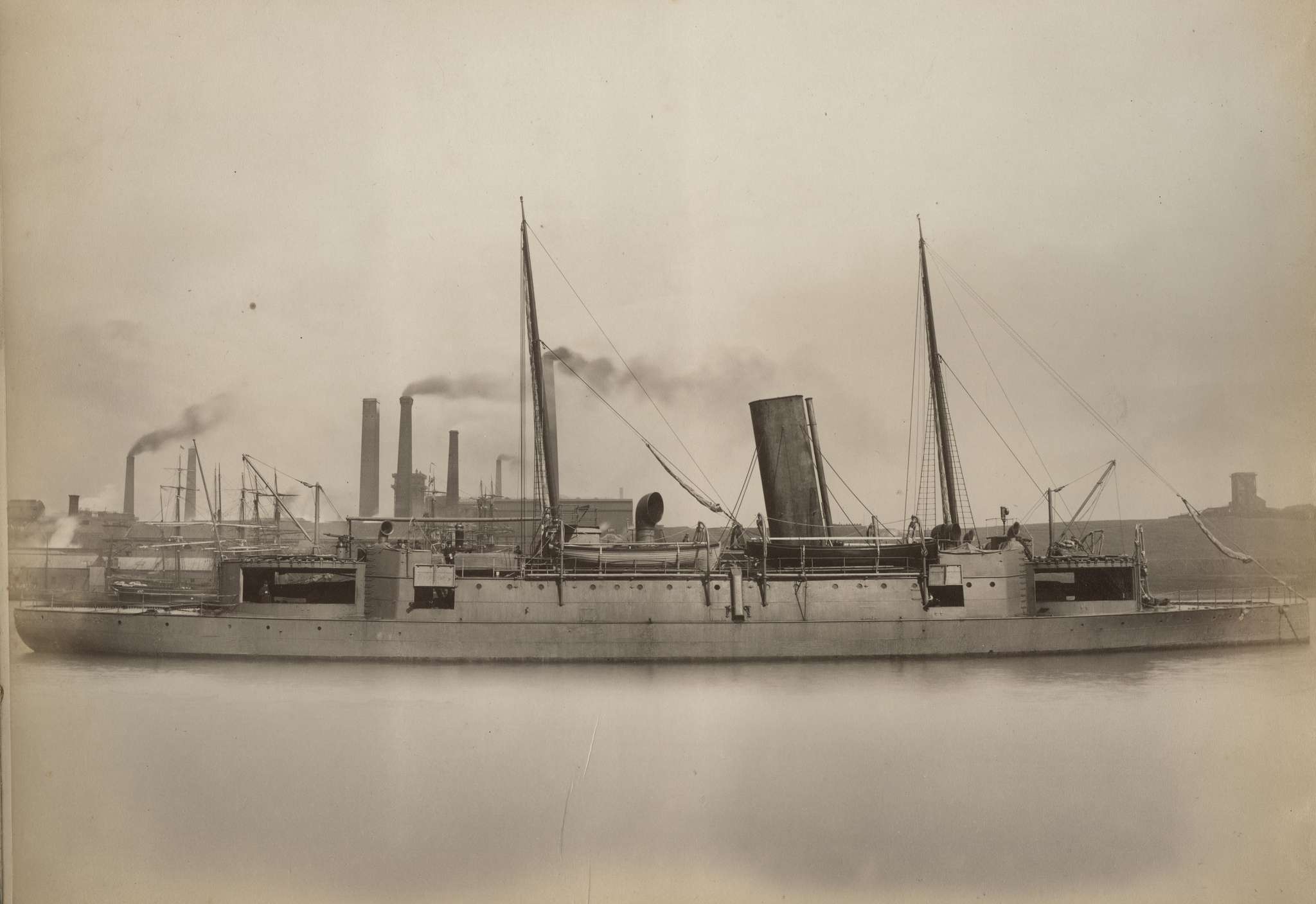
The Chinese cruiser Chaoyong, of the Imperial Chinese Navy.

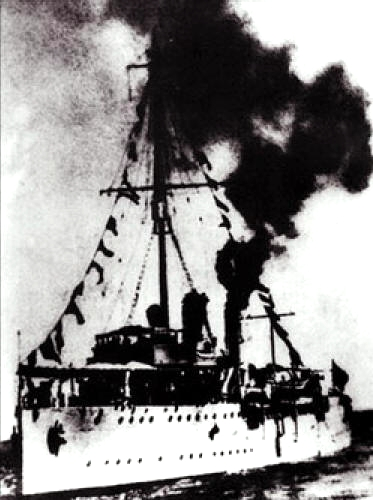
The Chinese coastal defence ship Zhongshan, of the Republic of China Navy.

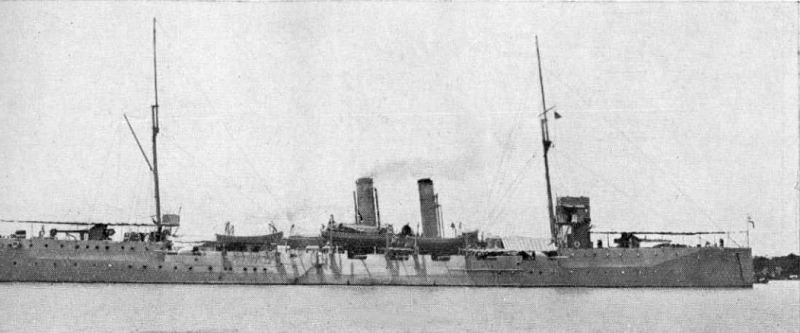
The Chinese cruiser Chao Ho, of the Republic of China Navy.

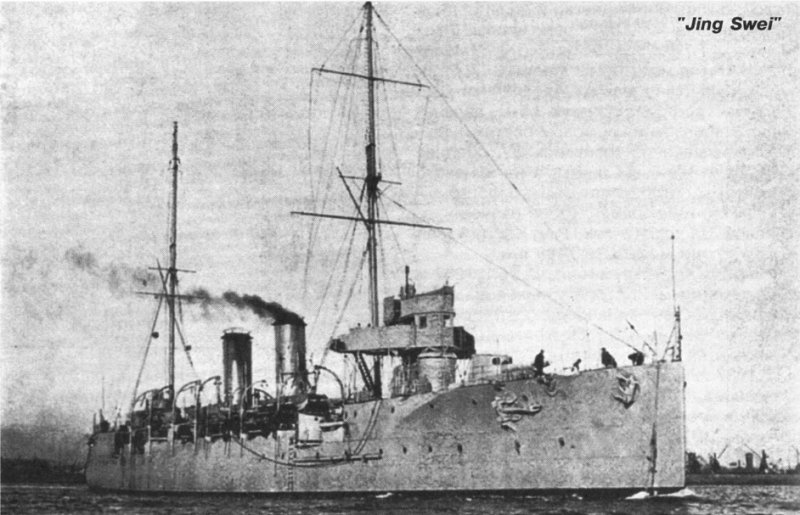
The Chinese cruiser Ying Rui, of the Republic of China Navy.

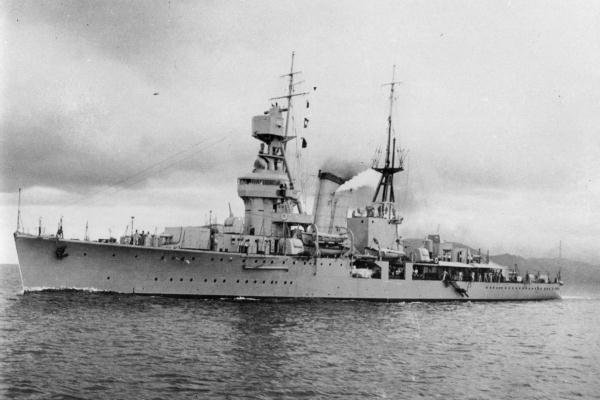
The Chinese cruiser Ning Hai, of the Republic of China Navy.

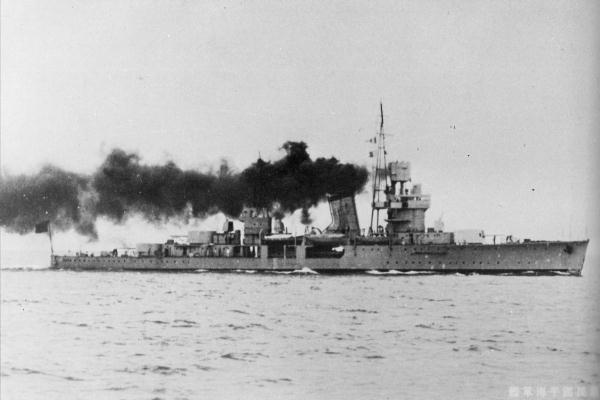
The Chinese cruiser Ping Hai, of the Republic of China Navy.

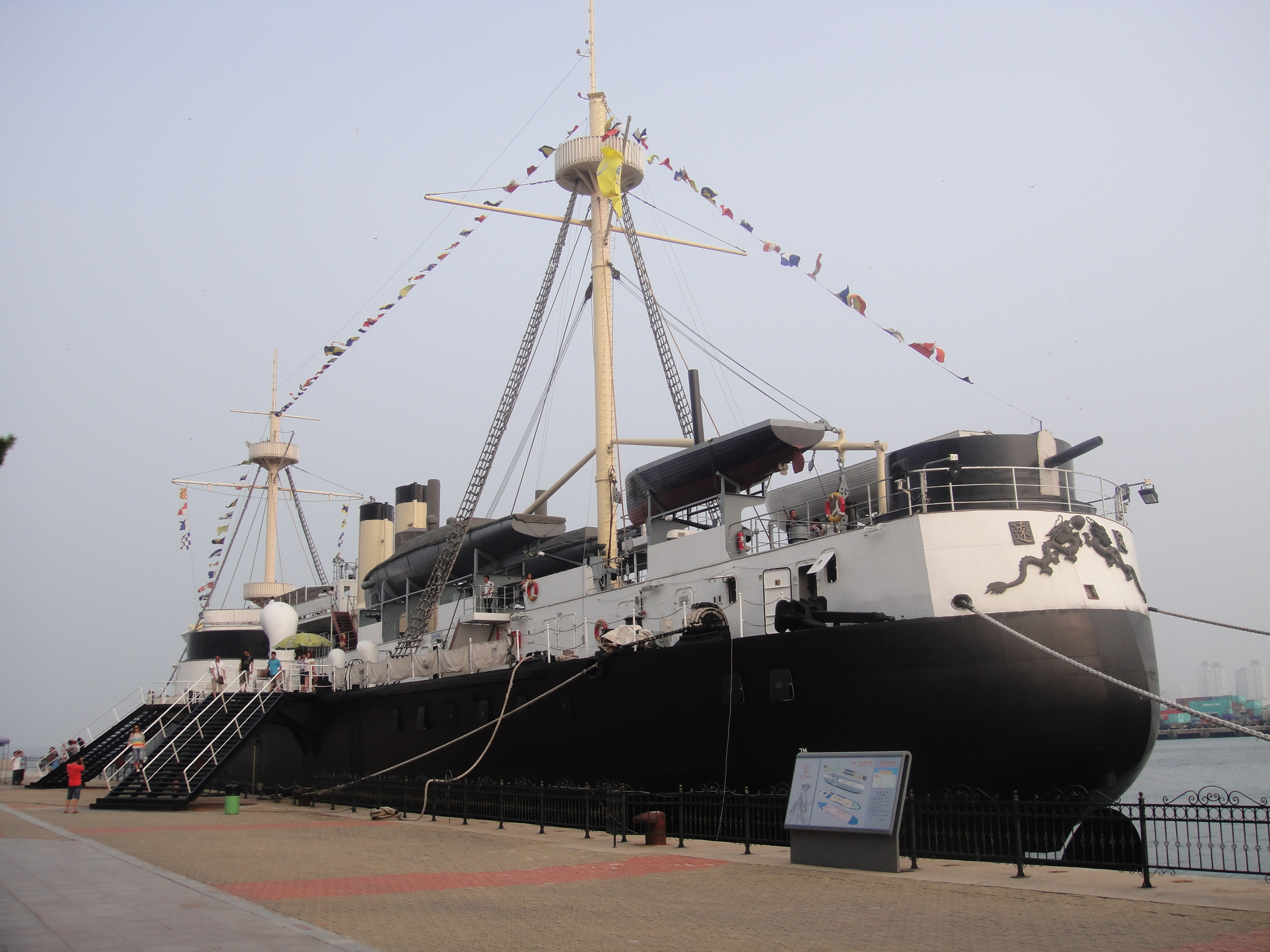
A modern replica of the Chinese ironclad Dingyuan, as a museum ship.

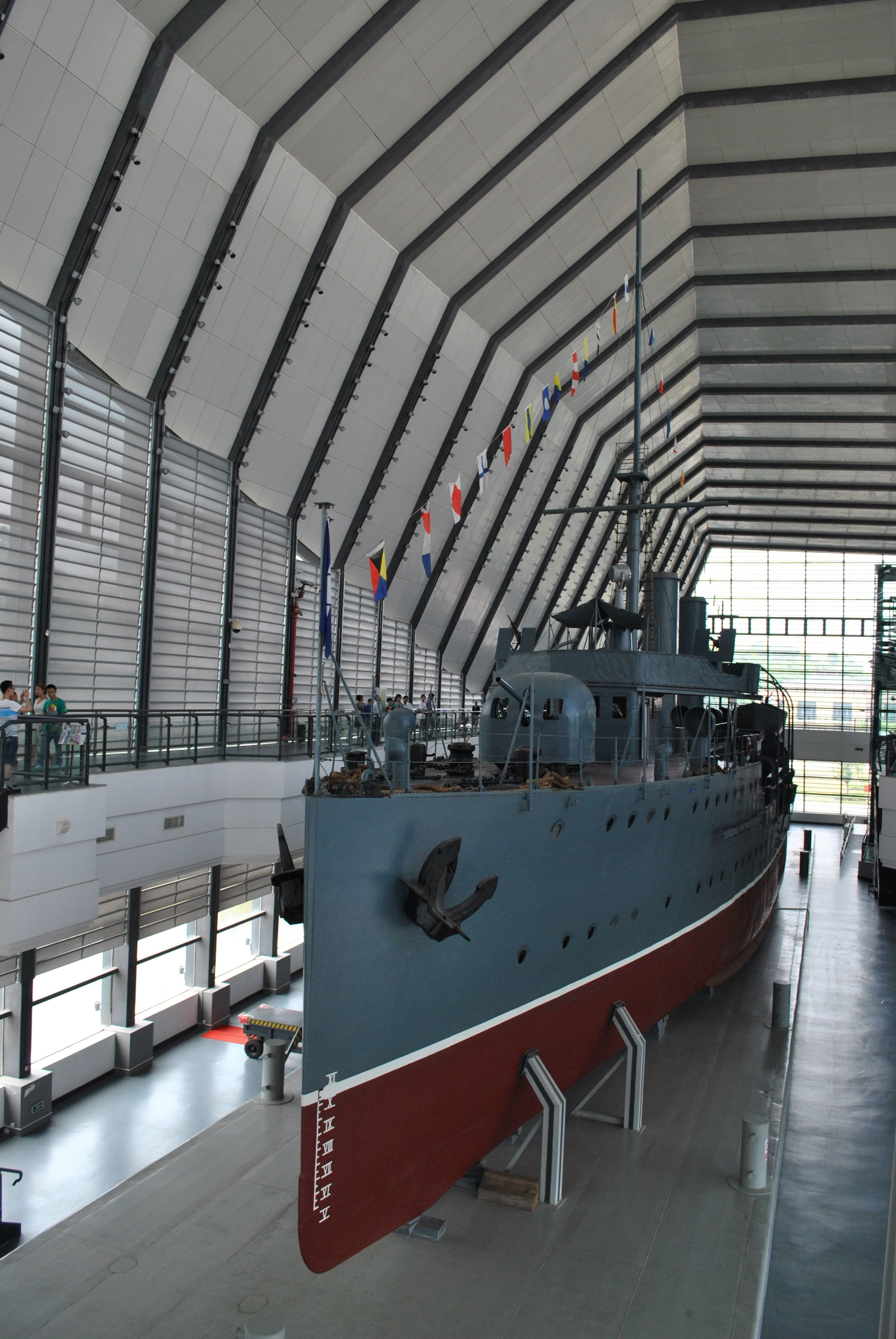
Restored Chinese coastal defence ship Zhongshan, as a museum ship in the Zhongshan Warship Museum.

== See also ==
- Military history of China before 1912
- Military history of China after 1911: PLA, ROCA
- History of canals in China
- History and technology of the Song dynasty
- Chinese exploration
- Imperial Chinese Navy
- Sailors in Ming China
