= Sailors in Ming China =

Sailors of the Ming dynasty, 1368–1644

This entry is about sailors during the Ming dynasty (1368–1644). China has a long history of navigation and sailing, and in the early Ming, Chinese navigational power was even stronger than the European powers. The founder of the Ming dynasty, the Hongwu Emperor, strictly prohibited sailing abroad, but one of his later successors, the Yongle Emperor, preferred to use large fleets to build a tributary system and to show the Ming empire's national power. After his death, however, emperors were disinclined for supporting such explorations to the world overseas. The revival of maritime trade happened in mid 16th century when the Portuguese were allowed to trade in the port city of Macao and the Longqing Emperor opened Quanzhou as a port for legal international trade.

== Origin of Ming sailors ==
Sailors were mainly from coastal areas, but the area of Min, today known as Fujian, was most famous for its people's skills in sailing. The Ming people chose to make a living from the sea because their lands were close to the ocean, making them too salty for efficient farming. These cultivated lands seldom produced enough crops, so most Ming people tended to work on boats or marine trade. The Ming government, however, prohibited maritime trade until 1567, so the Ming people's commercial activities were illegal. Caught between salty, infertile fields and the maritime ban, many of them secretly participated in illegal trade. Illegal trade attracted pirates, both from local areas and from Japan, whose interactions with coastal areas posed a threat to coastal defense officials. One Ming official pointed out that opening ports would benefit both the government and local people because allowing maritime trade could turn illegal profits into government revenue, while at the same time reducing the pressure on the Ming coastal defense.

=== Zheng He's voyages ===
Zheng He chose boatmen who had experience in sailing in the ocean from Fujian, Guangzhou, and Zhejiang areas. The Ming people's skills of navigation brought them a sterling reputation. One Ming envoy, Gao Cheng wrote a story about how Ming people helped him travel to Ryukyu to fulfill his duty. Gao Cheng was sent to Ryukyu but he knew nothing about sailing. His friends recommended him that Ming people knew sailing well and he found three sailors. These sailors pointed out that Gao's ship was not strong enough to sail across the sea, but it was too late, and also too costly, to build a new one. Though they knew the potential dangers, these experienced sailors showed excellent skills during the voyage. Gao described their skills, stating that they knew upcoming storms by seeing marine creatures, recognized nearby islands by observing the waves, and decided directions by reading a compass. They were calm when the ship was badly damaged in a storm, and comforted four hundred people during the danger. They arrived at Ryukyu safely, and the author praised not only Ming people's skills but also their virtues. While these experienced men made up a good portion of the seaman in Zheng He's voyages, however, they also included banished criminals who were pressed into service. These men were to be rewarded by the emperor with money and cloth should they survive the perilous journey, while their families would be compensated accordingly if a crew member died at sea.

== Division of occupation ==
In classical Chinese, people who professionally worked with navigation were generally called boat operators (Zhou Shi or Zhou Ren). The word originally meant navy, but from at least the Tang dynasty onward, its meaning changed to “boatman”. Later, after the Song dynasty, the word Zhou Shi specifically refers to skilled boatmen who had knowledge about geography and astronomy. They had to observe stars at night, sun at day, and compass in cloudy days. In the Ming dynasty, the boat operator's responsibility was more specialized: people separately managed anchors, masts, sails, rudders. Many ships also had specific men in charge of worshiping sea gods (sixiang).

=== Zheng He's voyages ===
In Zheng He's fleets, the records of specialization were slightly different. There were people called foreman (huozhang), who were specifically responsible for directions in navigation by using complicated knowledge about the compass. They usually came from coastal areas where people mainly lived near the sea and thus many of them had rich sailing experience. Rudder operators (duogong) were in charge of physically operating rudders under the instructions of foremen. Anchorman (bandingshou) controls dropping and weighing anchors. There were also people who repaired the anchors, hulls and sails. The fleets in Zheng He's voyages were also populated by various other people with differing skills. During Zheng He's voyages, eunuchs served as ambassadors to other countries and worked on administrative posts on the ships, while boat captains were appointed by the emperor and were allowed to kill any dissenters on board to maintain order. Other crew members included astrologers and geomancers who were responsible for forecasting the weather, interpreting natural events, keep the calendar, and made astronomical observations to help the fleet navigate the seas, while 180 medical officers and pharmacologists served on ships to treat wounded or sick sailors. To help with communication with other nations, ten instructors served on board as translators, and were given the title “tong yi fan shu jiao yu guan,” meaning “teacher who knows foreign books”. Finally, specialized workmen to help repair and maintain the ship such as ironsmiths, scaffolding builders, and caulkers were included as part of the ship's crew so repairs could proceed efficiently when needed. The complex number of moving parts on the ships during Zheng He's voyages showed the many different sub-occupations sailors had.

== Nautical technology and knowledge ==
=== Navigation innovations ===
Technologically, Ming sailors took advantage of advances made over thousands of years by preceding powers and dynasties. Much of Ming sailors relied on navigation based on star observations, known to the sailors as hai zhong. However, Ming sailors were able to take advantage of the magnetic compass, which was developed and in use by the 11th century. By the late 16th and early 17th centuries, Ming navigators were using terrestrial globes as a method for navigation. While globes were first developed by the ancient Greeks and later preserved by Arab scholars, the Ming readily accepted this as a form of navigation.

=== Shipbuilding innovations ===
Ming sailors were also able to take advantage of centuries of shipbuilding innovation from previous regimes. Most if not all Ming sailors at the time sailed on six different types of ships: tower ships, combat junks, sea hawk ships, covered swoopers, flying barques, and patrol boats. While many of these ships were made for military operations, they some ships were also converted into civilian use. These different types of ships were not only built differently, but were also varied to fit the needs of a specific region. For example, sea going vessels in Jiangnan had flat and broad bottoms for sailing over shoals and sandbanks, but ships in Fujian and Guangdong had rounded bottoms and high decks for easy maneuverability around rocks and other dangerous obstacles in the deep ocean. As a result of this, the different composition of these ships meant that the skills of the sailors varied from these ship types. In addition, most Chinese ships used multiple sails, an innovation that Europeans would not take advantage of until the late 15th century. Because of the multiple sails, Ming sailors were able to take advantage of wind more often, as greater surface area of multiple sails gave ships greater propulsion in water. In fact, during the various voyages of Zheng He, the largest treasure ships had nine masts to compensate for the large 440 foot long ships that the wind needed to push.

=== Communication innovations ===
Communication was also vital for sailors during the Ming dynasty. During Zheng He's voyages, an elaborate system of sound and visual signals were developed to better coordinate with other ships. The system included signal bells, five large banners, a large drum and flag, gongs, and ten lanterns. Sailors thus had to know which sound or visual cue meant. For example, sound signals were meant for onboard commands, while drums signaled to neighboring ships to seek harbor for approaching storms. Meanwhile, lanterns were used to convey signals at night or in poor weather while carrier pigeons were used to carry out long distance messages.

=== Knowledge ===
Knowledge about ocean currents was important to sailors during the Ming dynasty. One source pointed out that in the first, second, third, fourth, fifth, sixth and thirtieth day of every month, the water was “awake” (shui xing), which meant the ocean would be more violent and water flowed much rapidly. The ocean would be calm and still on the seventh to fifteenth in every month and would again be violent from sixteenth to twentieth day. Then, water would be calm from twenty first to the end of every month.

== Sailor's beliefs ==
Sailors had diverse idols and religious figures, but people worshiped and sacrificed to them mainly for a safe voyage and material wealth. There were three main sea gods who enjoyed continual worship: Guan Yu, Mazu, and the God of Boats.

=== Guan Yu ===
Guan Yu, the Han general, was formally deified by Emperor Wanli in 1615. Guan Yu was originally a general in the Three Kingdoms period. He is celebrated by Chinese for his bravery and loyalty. Later, he was deified as one Daoist god and enjoyed sacrifices for various purposes.

=== Mazu ===
Tianfei, the Heavenly Princess, or Mazu, was the most famous sea goddess in Chinese marine culture. Originally, she was a Song woman with a surname of Lin born in a county of Fujian, the Min area. Sailors believed that she had the power to rescue endangered people on the sea and worshiped her for safety during a voyage. She was granted different titles through the Song, Yuan and Ming governments. During the reign of Emperor Wanli, she was portrayed as a guardian of the nation, protector of the people and a bright, benevolent goddess. Mazu had a temple in the region of Chiwan, where Shenzhen is today. Fisherman and sailors regularly visited the religious site to attend religious ceremonies, praying for protection against the dangers of the sea. One particular ceremony was the cisha, or "to leave the sand" ceremony, in which sailors prayed at the shrine to leave land and enter the sea. In this particular ceremony, sailors would prepare offerings of beef, lamb, and pork, sacrifice the animals, strip the meat from them, and fill the skin with grass to be plunged into the ocean.

=== God of Boats ===
It is unknown that when the God of Boats was created, but he was widely worshiped by sailors. Sailors had their conventional knowledge to predict weather. For instance, one record wrote that “if the southeast sky is cloudy in the morning, it will be rapid rain before noon; if the northwest sky is cloudy in the evening, it will be windy rain at midnight.”

=== Omens and superstitions ===
Sailors also had their own taboos. For example, it was ominous to load ships with goods in every first, seventh, eleventh, seventeenth, twenty-third, and thirtieth day of solar months and every third, seventh, twelfth, and twenty-sixth day of lunar months.

== In literature ==
Literary works about seafaring during the Ming dynasty mainly focus on three categories: ocean deities, fighting Japanese pirates, and rags-to-riches stories. Protagonists usually go on voyages due to poverty, and they experience various miracles or fortunate accidents which make them rich. For example, “The Tangerine and the Tortoise-Shell” comes from Slapping the Table in Amazement (Pai An Jing Qi) by Ling Mengchu. It talks about a young man named Wen Ruoxu who goes to sea with some merchants and sell tangerines from Lake Tongting to a foreign country and gains money. Later, he finds a tortoise-shell in an island. Wen sells it to a Persian merchant and uses the silver he gets to start business and becomes a rich merchant in Min area.

== See also ==
Naval history of China
