= HMAS Sydney I – SMS Emden Memorial =

Heritage-listed war memorial in Sydney, Australia

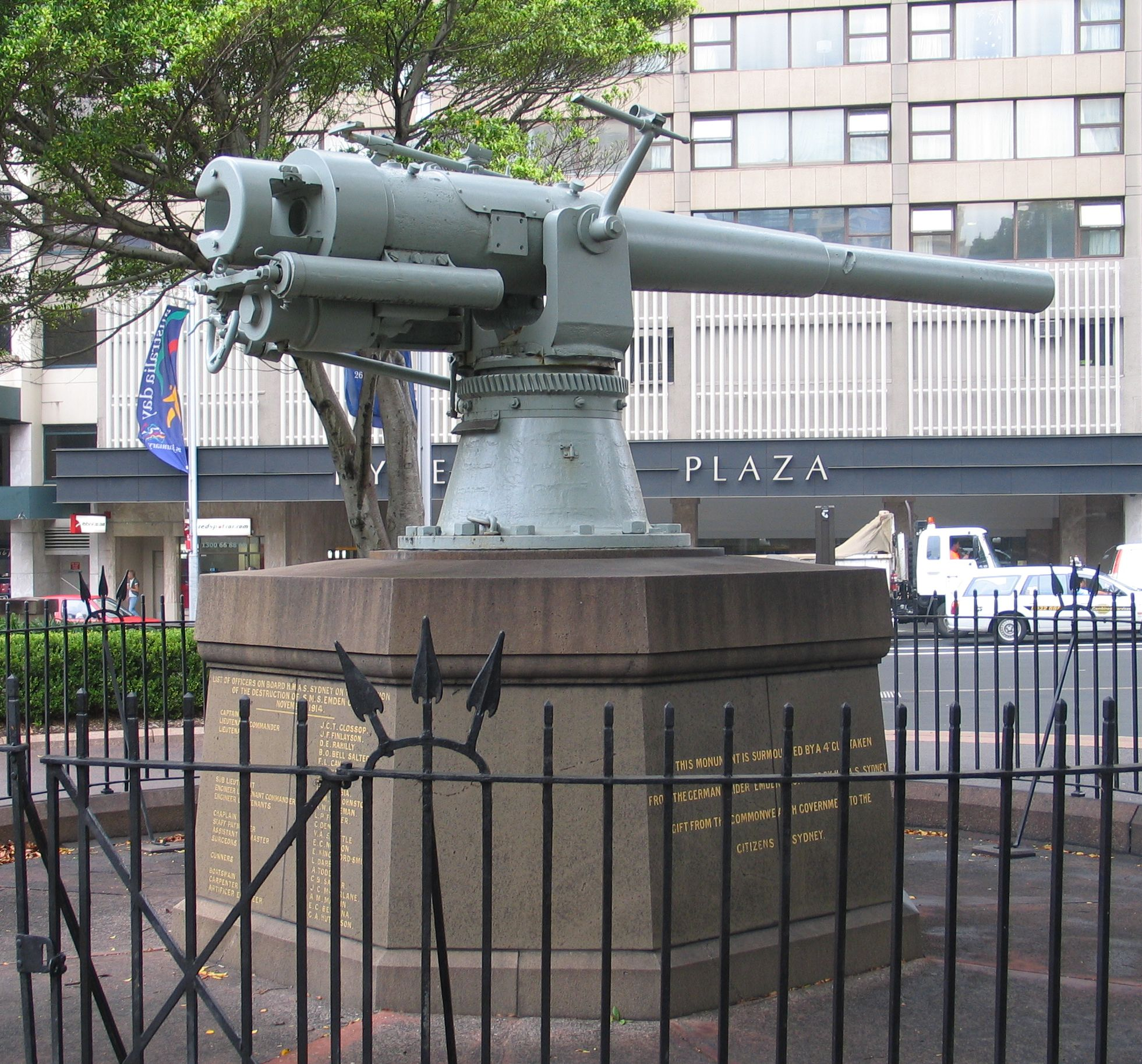

- Location within Sydney
- 33.8765°S 151.2119°E
- Location: Hyde Park, corner of Liverpool and College Streets, Sydney central business district, City of Sydney, New South Wales, Australia

History
- Built: 1917

Site notes
- Architect: City of Sydney
- Owner: City of Sydney

New South Wales Heritage Register
- Official name: HMAS Sydney 1 - SMS Emden Memorial (moveable heritage item); Emden Gun
- Type: state heritage (movable / collection)
- Designated: 27 February 2015
- Reference no.: 1946
- Type: Defence Objects (movable)
- Category: Defence
- Builders: Messrs Loveridge and Hudson, Redfern

HMAS Sydney I – SMS Emden Memorial is a heritage-listed former foreign naval ship gun and now war memorial and war trophy located in Hyde Park, on the corner of Liverpool and College Streets in the Sydney central business district, in the City of Sydney local government area of New South Wales, Australia. It was designed by City of Sydney and built from 1917 by Messrs Loveridge and Hudson, Redfern. It is also known as HMAS Sydney 1 - SMS Emden Memorial (moveable heritage item) and Emden Gun. The property is owned by City of Sydney. It was added to the New South Wales State Heritage Register on 27 February 2015.

== History ==
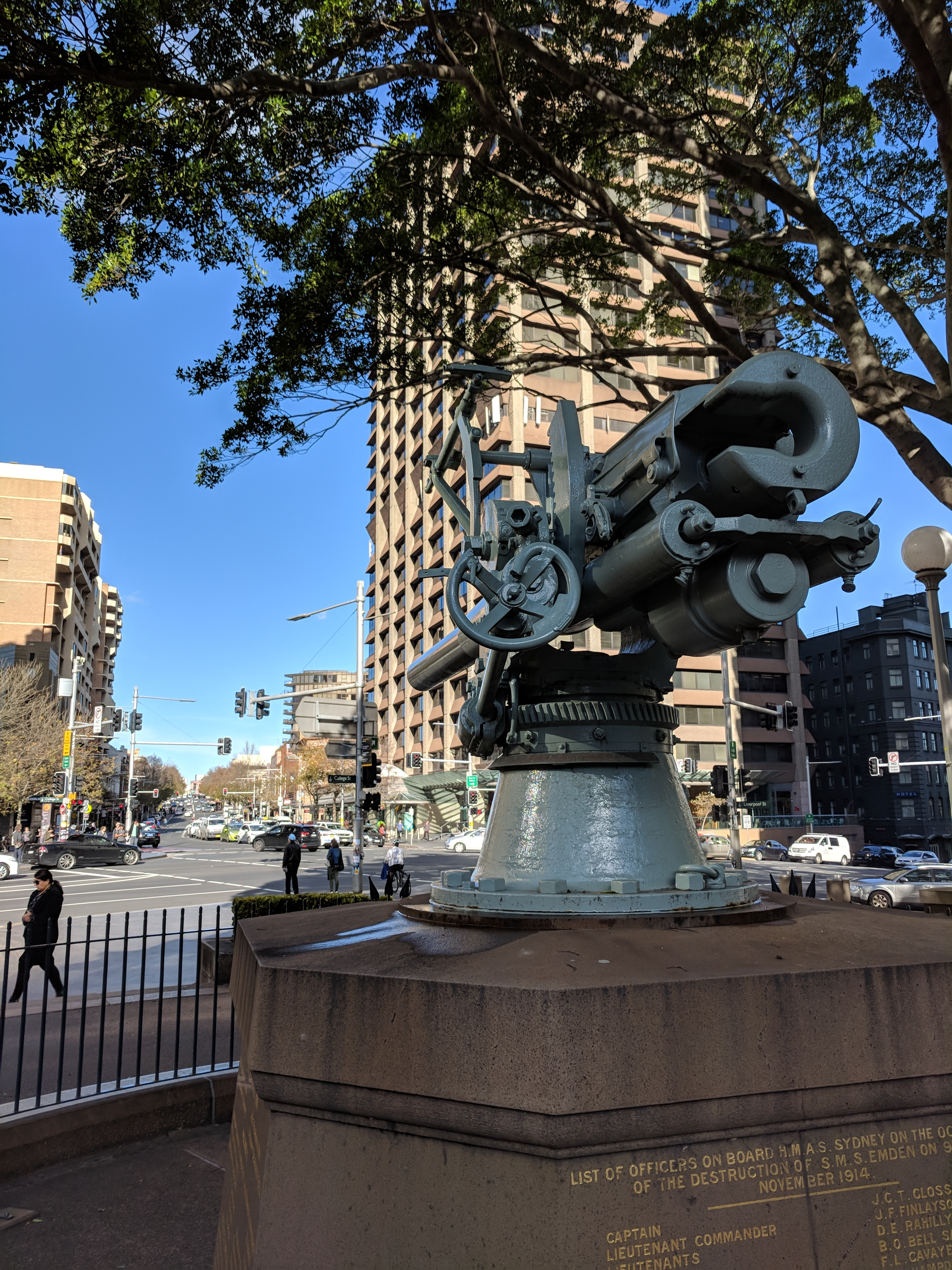
The breach of the Emden gun, facing towards Whitlam Square, up Oxford Street, in 2018.

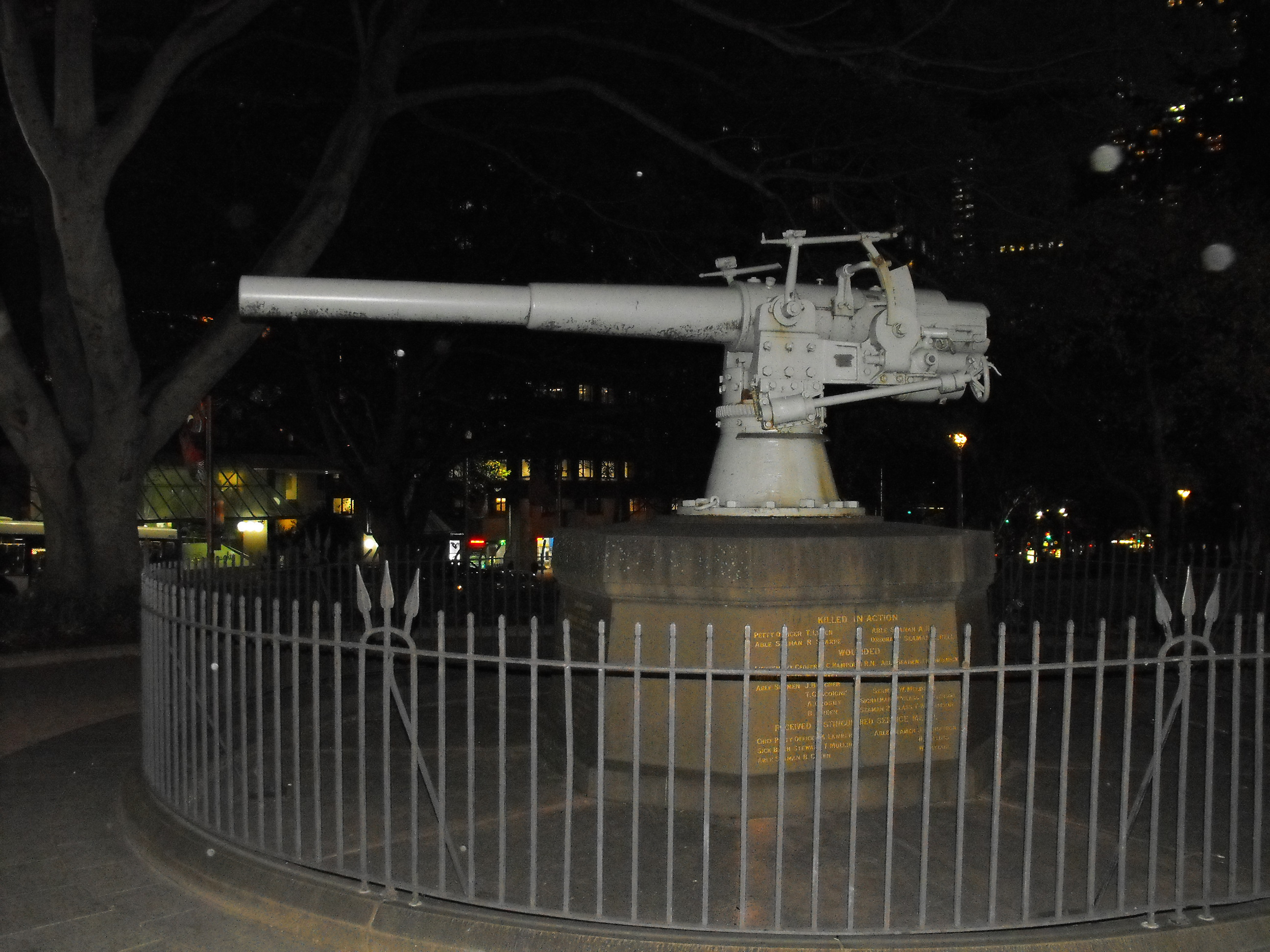
The Emden gun, pictured at night in 2012.

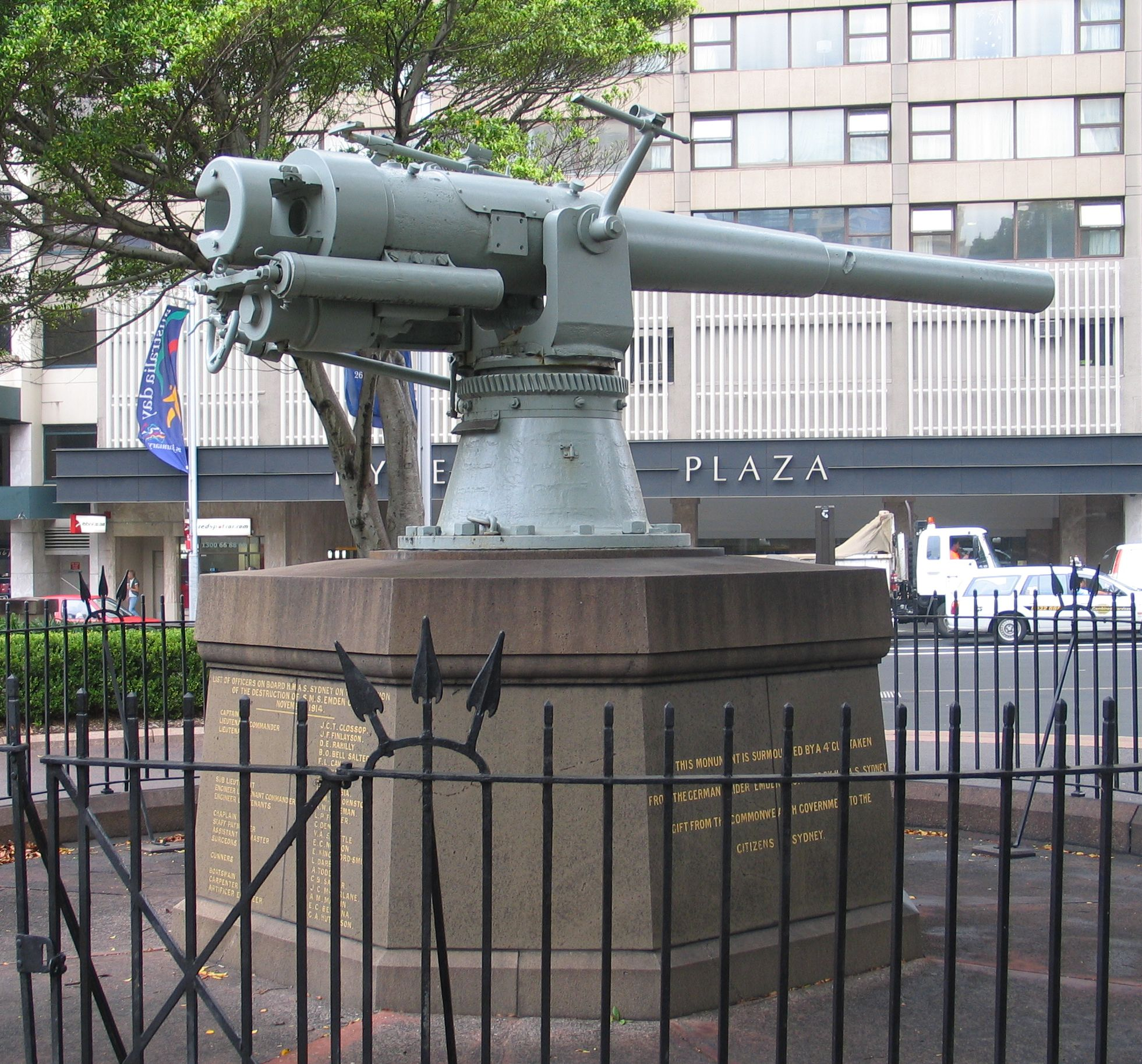
The Emden gun, pictured in 2007.

=== SMS Emden ===
SMS Emden was a Dresden class light cruiser with ten 10.5 cm/40 (4.1 inch) breach loading guns, eight 2 inch quick firing guns and two 17.7 inch submerged torpedo tubes. Part of the German East Asiatic Squadron formed at the beginning of World War I, the SMS Emden was detached from the squadron to stalk and attack the shipping routes across the Indian Ocean, quickly becoming a problem for the Allied navies in the area. From August to October 1914, she captured or sank 21 vessels including a cruiser, destroyer and sixteen merchant ships. She coaled eleven times from three captured colliers and attacked the major Indian port of Madras, destroying 350 000 gallons of oil after firing 125 shells into the oil storage facilities in ten minutes. These activities caused major disruption to transport in the Indian Ocean, drawing the attention of 78 warships from four different navies.

=== HMAS Sydney I ===
HMAS Sydney I was a Chatham-class light cruiser with eight 6 inch guns. It is recognised as one of the most distinguished Royal Australian Navy (RAN) warships of the First World War. At the outbreak of the war, the Sydney was one of four war ships escorting the first convoy of Australian and New Zealand troops that left Albany, Western Australia for the Middle East on 1 November 1914. The heavy protection was due to the threat the SMS Emden posed to the convoy. HMAS Sydney was detached from the convoy together with eight other Allied vessels to investigate an SOS from Direction Island in the Cocos Keeling Islands group regarding a "strange ship". The Sydney located the Emden while an Emden landing party, led by its Executive Office, Kapitanleutnant Hellmuth von Mucke, was on a raid on Direction Island. The SOS had been sent prior to communications being disabled.

=== Destruction of the Emden ===
On 9 November 1914, SMS Emden opened fire at 9 kilometres (10,000 yd) with her starboard guns, knocking out Sydney's range finder. Emden continued to score hits, knocking out a gun and starting a fire before Sydney managed to find Emden's range and hit the German cruiser over 100 times in 30 minutes. Emden’s captain, Fregattenkapitan Karl von Muller, chose to run the Emden aground before it sank on North Keeling, an isolated island in the Cocos Keeling group. With this action the Royal Australian Navy had won its first ship-to-ship battle. Casualties of the battle included 134 killed from the Emden and four killed from the Sydney. Prisoners of war taken from SMS Emden were interned at the disused sandstone Berrima Gaol in the Southern Highlands of NSW.

The destruction of SMS Emden, the first cruiser duel of the war, represented the first ship-to-ship battle and victory for the Royal Australian Navy. Feted in England as a British sea power victory, the victory also cemented the belief in Australia that it could maintain its own navy.

Emden's destruction was cause for celebration for the allies and soon various participants in its downfall made claims for its relics. The crew of HMS Cadmus commenced formal salvage of relics in 1914 when it collected flags, steaming lights, the boat's compass, plans and other smaller items. The next salvage operation collected more substantial items such as one deck gun (suggested to be the gun now located in Hyde Park), armaments, a rifle, additional guns and gun mountings and a searchlight. Several items were sent to England and the remainder (including the large guns) were sent to Australia. Later operations saw the collection of additional guns, bells, compasses, steering wheels and a variety of other artefacts. Many of these were also distributed throughout Australia. Mexican coins found on the ship were converted to medals and medallions to be sold or given away. Some of the medals and medallions were eventually melted down and the silver recovered and sold to the mint after interest in them waned as the war dragged on. In total, four largely complete guns were salvaged from the wreck, three for Australia and one for Great Britain. Parts of the other guns were also salvaged and the remainder were left at the site of the wreck.

=== Establishment of the monument ===
The Commonwealth Government, via the Department of the Navy, offered the gun to the City of Sydney as a gift in 1917. It was offered to Sydney over the City of Madras, the Indian port attacked by Emden, due to the difficulties of salvaging relics from the Emden at the time. It was also deemed fitting that the city (after which the victorious cruiser had been named) should be in possession of a trophy of the battle).

The City of Sydney officially accepted the gun on 20 August 1917. The gun was unveiled in its present position as a monument to HMAS Sydney's victory over SMS Emden by the Lord Mayor of Sydney R. D. Meagher, the Deputy Town Clerk, and the Architect and City Building Surveyor on 21 December 1917 in front of a cheering crowd. At the time of its unveiling, the gun was variously described as a token of the "success and efficiency" of the navy and a trophy of war "won by the youngest navy in the world under circumstances which bring a thrill of pride and gratification to all true Australians and faithful sons of Empire that the young Australian Navy is worthy to rank with the great and glorious parent - the British Navy". The Lord Mayor remarked to all present that "the Australian who visits the spot and reflects on this trophy, will feel proud of a land which has turned over the virgin page of its naval history by an imperishable act of splendid courage graced with superb magnanimity".

Mr J Cook, Minister of the Navy, stated at the unveiling that the memorial reminded them, above all else, "of the wonderful fabric of self-government, which was the very mainspring and very condition precedent of the successful government of this mighty Empire of Ours. It also reminded them that naval defence and sea power was the secret of all our Empire's success". Cook claimed that the gun was the first trophy of "our Australian Navy" and established the paramountcy of the Australian Navy as one of the features of the mighty empire.

The acquisition of war trophies was not new to Australia, but generally they had been acquired from the British Government as a colony of the British Empire. For example, canons from the Crimean War were shipped throughout the United Kingdom and the colonies, the first arriving in Australia (Victoria) from the 1860s. Made of cast and wrought iron, they would not deteriorate as trophies from later wars (made from timber and easily corroded metals) would quickly do. War trophies captured by the Australian contingents during the Boer War had to be applied for through the British Government and, as a result, few trophy guns were ever recovered from these early campaigns.

Australians quickly took to the idea of collecting war trophies and they fought to keep those items of victory they believed rightfully theirs. Australia collected more trophies per head of population than any other country and, while most of these trophies were collected on the Western front (after Gallipoli), the first Australian trophies of World War One were collected in 1914 and were of naval origin. For example, a German ship was captured in New Guinea in 1914 without a shot being fired. However, it was the 4.1 inch gun removed from SMS Emden, only a month after its destruction, that became Australia's first official war trophy. The British attached so much importance to this early success that they obtained a second, identical gun, from the wreck.

The acquisition of the Emden gun by the City of Sydney was a much different process than that of most war trophies. It was one of the first to arrive in Australia and it became the first gun to be turned into a memorial. The siting reflected the general preference of the time to place monuments and memorials in prominent and accessible locations (such as parks or at central intersections) at the beginning of a phase of memorial development inspired by World War One and other events associated with the creation of national identity. Most other trophies were brought back to Australia in 1919 and distributed through a system of State Trophy Committees in response to trophy requests. Furthermore, most trophies were not captured until 1916 or later, with many captured following victories on the battlefields of France and Belgium. Trophies from early in the war, particularly Gallipoli, were rare both then and now as the soldiers were unable to take many trophies with them when withdrawing from the early battles. In addition, these early battles (particularly Gallipoli) were a defining moment in Australian history, but many were not victories. Trophies by their very nature were objects collected and stored for safekeeping during successful advances.

Soon after World War One, Australia had more war memorials per head of population than any other country in the world. The memorials were permanent and provided an opportunity for the Australian community to give those men lost at war the funeral they never had. This was important in the context that Australia was one of the few countries to send an entirely volunteer force to the war and, in doing so, the force suffered the highest proportion of casualties. Tragically only one of the 60,000 Australian men who died were repatriated for burial on home soil at that time.

Unlike statues on a plinth or similar style monuments, the trophy guns came to be seen as highly egalitarian and representative of the collective rather than the individual effort. Names were not inscribed on the trophy gun memorials unlike other monuments which displayed selectivity by honouring some and not others. They were a forceful and unambiguous symbol of recent military events. This is where the Emden gun differs from many of its counterparts. While it was recognisable as being related to recent military events, it named the people who died and singled out those who served with distinguished service. Its importance is identified, not so much because of its conformity with the process, but the difference.

==== History, post World War II ====
During and after the World War II, commemorative activity shifted from the symbolic to the practical with parks, halls and swimming pools being constructed. Issues of memory, natural deterioration, changing social and political changing attitudes towards war and war trophies and the difficulties of justifying the spending of sometimes tens of thousands of dollars on restoring the war trophies, has seen the number of surviving World War One trophies decline dramatically in Australia. In 1996, it was estimated that 80 per cent of these trophies had been lost (although Australia's war trophy collection still remained the largest in the world). Increasingly what was left had been transferred into private hands where money was available for conservation. However, value and interest still exists in terms of historical and collectable interest. The Emden Gun has presumably survived because of its protective fence, the size and wealth of the City of Sydney Council (which has resulted in the availability of funding to conserve the gun over the years), the physical presence of the gun within a recognisable memorial park which is large enough and important enough to draw ongoing interest, its formal mounting on a plinth and its obvious value as an object associated with a specific and well known historical event.

In the 21st century, the Emden Gun in Hyde Park remains a reminder of an important victory for the Australian Navy and the Australian crew involved in the Emden action. However, the erection of the HMAS Sydney Mast Memorial on Bradley's Head in 1934 by Mosman Council took over as the main site for commemoration of the Emden action and the Australian seamen involved. Formal commemoration of the Emden action in 1934 was even delayed until the unveiling of the Bradleys Head memorial, suggesting that the new memorial took over the primary commemorative role. However, wreathes do continue to be laid at the Emden Gun memorial on dates such as ANZAC Day.

When viewed in the context of war trophies in NSW, the Emden Gun (together with other World War One and Crimean War trophy relics, such as those found elsewhere in Hyde and Centennial Parks) are permanent physical reminders of the values placed on victories in war that contribute to our social memory. They also represent a shift towards commemoration of men and women who have died in the course of all conflicts and peacekeeping activities, and the changing role of those monuments which are conflict-specific but no longer have a community of service men and women with direct links to those conflicts due to the passage of time.

The three largely complete Emden 10.5 cm (4.1 inch) guns in Australia are retained within the Naval Heritage Collection, Sydney the Australian War Memorial, Canberra and at Hyde Park, Sydney. The barrels of a further two are held at HMAS Penguin. A fourth gun was salvaged by the British Government and taken back to England but it is unclear where it is now located. The gun at the Australian War Memorial is considered to be in the best condition. Some other larger items are also known to exist including the ships binnacles (compass) in the Naval Heritage Collection. A variety of smaller items are located in places such as the Australian War Memorial in Canberra, the Powerhouse and National Maritime museums in Sydney, and the museums and offices of various naval and naval interest organisations.

== Description ==
The 10.5 cm/40 calibre (4.1 inch) naval gun is located in the south eastern corner of Hyde Park South at the corner of Liverpool and College Streets. It has a physical connection to the ANZAC War Memorial and Pool of Reflection via the path linking Anzac Memorial to Whitlam Square. The path is one of a network of paved pathways throughout the park.

Mounted on an octagonal Bowral trachyte base with the muzzle facing Whitlam Square, the memorial is encircled by an iron palisade fence on stone kerbing. The area within the fence is paved with eight large trapezoidal stone pavers aligned with the octagonal base of the memorial. The base is inscribed in gold with the date and purpose of the opening of the memorial and the names of those killed and wounded from the HMAS Sydney in the Emden battle, officers on board and those who received the distinguished service medal.

The gun itself is composed of two different elements, a rotating mounting or platform, and the gun barrel proper. The pedestal has a wide circular plate bolted to the base with a mounting supporting the barrel of the gun allowing it to swivel vertically. The unit is painted metal and brass work, storm grey in colour, with a small number of exposed timber areas such as the wooden handle on the sighting trigger and a timber holster.

Inscriptions:
South Face:

This monument is surmounted by a "4 Gun taken
from the German raider "Emden" destroyed by H.M.A.S. Sydney
A Gift from the Commonwealth Government to the Citizens of Sydney.

West Face:

THIS MONUMENT WAS ERECTED BY THE MUNICIPAL COUNCIL OF SYDNEY TO COMMEMORATE THE DESTRUCTION OF THE GERMAN RAIDER "EMDEN" BY H.M.A.S. SYDNEY COMMANDED BY CAPTAIN JOHN C.T. GLOSSOP R.N. IN THE NAVAL ACTION COCOS ISLAND ON THE 9TH NOVEMBER 1914. THE MONUMENT BEING UNVEILED ON 21ST DECEMBER 1917 BY THE RIGHT HON. R.D. MEAGHER M.L.C LORD MAYOR OF SYDNEY, W.C. LAYTON THOMAS H. NESBITT, DEPUTY TOWN CLERK, R.H. BRODRICK ARCHITECT AND CITY BUILDING SURVEYOR.'

East Face:

KILLED IN ACTION: PETTY OFFICER T.LYNCH ABLE SEAMAN A. HOY ABLE SEAMAN R. SHARPE ORDINARY SEAMAN R. BELL WOUNDED: LIEUTENANT GEOFFREY C. HAMPDEN R.N. ABLE SEAMAN J. KINNIBURGH PETTY OFFICER M. HARVEY R. HORNE ABLE SEAMEN: J. BUTCHER T. GASCOIGNE A. HOOPER A. CROSBY B. GREEN SEAMAN W.MELDRUM SIGNALMAN 2ND CLASS T.STEVENSON SEAMAN 2ND CLASS T WILLIAMSON RECEIVED DISTINGUISHED SERVICE MEDAL: ABLE SEAMEN: W.TAYLOR H.COLLINS J.KINNIBURGH CHIEF PETTY OFFICER A.LAMBET SICK BERTH STEWARD T.MULLINS ABLE SEAMAN B.GREEN

North Face:

LIST OF OFFICERS ON BOARD H.M.A.S. SYDNEY ON THE OCCASION\ OF THE DESTRUCTION OF S.M.S. EMDEN ON 9TH NOVEMBER 1914. CAPTAIN J.C.T. GLOSSOP. LIEUTENANT COMMANDER J.F. FINLAYSON. LIEUNANT D.E.RAHILLY. B.O. BELL SALTER. F.L. CAVAYE. G.C. HAMPDEN. C. POE. R.C. GARSIA. SUB LIEUTENANT J.M.C. JOHNSTONE. ENGINEER LIEUTENANT COMMANDER A.W. COLEMAN. ENGINEER LIEUTENANT L.P.FOWLER. C. DENNIS. CHAPLIN V.A.S. LITTLE. STAFF PAYMASTER E.C. NORTON. ASSISTANT PAYMASTER E. KINGSFORD PAYMASTER. SURGEONS L. DARBY. A. TODD. GUNNERS G.B. SALTER. J.C. MCFARLANE. BOATSWAIN A.M. MARTIN. CARPENTER E.C. BEHENNA. ARTIFICER ENGINEER C.A. HUTCHISON.

=== Condition ===
As at 29 October 2009, the gun is in very good condition, having undergone conservation works to remove old, damaged paintwork and corrosive products and repainting in 2005. However, it is beginning to show signs of oxidisation again due to it location out in the open. The base is also in very good condition.

The Emden Gun has a high degree of integrity and intactness due to care taken to preserve all important elements during conservation works

=== Modifications and dates ===
- 1915 – February: removed from the SMS Emden
- 1917 – December: installed in Hyde Park
- 1918 – Gilding added to the lettering and a name corrected on the base
- 2005 – Removed for conservation works and reinstalled

== Heritage listing ==
As at 19 February 2010, the HMAS Sydney I - SMS Emden Memorial (the Emden Gun) is of state significance as a major component of the German ship SMS Emden, defeated by the Royal Australian Navy in its first ship-to-ship battle. The gun is one of only four salvaged from the cruiser, three of which are located in Australia.

Its significance is magnified by the value of the gun as a reminder of the Australian naval crew who served and died in action. Its retrieval was a symbol of victory and proof of the success that could be achieved with the strength and patriotism that accompanied self-government and loyalty as part of Empire. It is an important relic in the suite of relics found across the state which visually demonstrate the actions participated in by the British Empire and the Australian nation from the Crimean War through to current peace keeping activities. Today, the gun serves as a reminder of world history.

The memorial itself is an important reminder of the battle between the HMAS Sydney I and the German ship SMS Emden and the sailors of both fleets who served with honour during the battle. The memorial also serves to remember those who sacrificed their lives in the battle - four lives from the Royal Australian Navy and 134 lives from the SMS Emden. The gun has national significance as the first naval war trophy of the First World War.

HMAS Sydney I – SMS Emden Memorial was listed on the New South Wales State Heritage Register on 27 February 2015 having satisfied the following criteria.

The place is important in demonstrating the course, or pattern, of cultural or natural history in New South Wales.

The Emden Gun has state historical significance as an element of the first ship defeated in ship-to-ship battle by the Royal Australian Navy (RAN). Its significance is further enhanced by the battle being the Royal Australian Navy's first ship-to-ship naval engagement and the gun being Australia's first naval World War I trophy. The sinking of the German SMS Emden was a significant naval achievement for the fledgling RAN and initiated the concept that Australia was capable of defending its interests in the Indian Ocean and the Pacific, thereby contributing to the development of an independent identity for the nation. National pride in the achievement was such that celebration of the success endures. Emden's history, particularly its raiding activities on the shipping routes in the Indian Ocean for six weeks in 1914, made it an important target for the Allies and the gun an important historical relic of this World War I event.

The place has a strong or special association with a person, or group of persons, of importance of cultural or natural history of New South Wales's history.

The Emden Gun has state significance for its historical association with World War I Armed Forces, specifically the Navy and its German East Asiatic Squadron. It also has significance for its historical association with the individuals, governments and organisations who were involved in the Emden action and the events preceding it. The memorial has strong associations with the actions of one of the most distinguished and recognisable Royal Australian Navy ships of World War I, HMAS Sydney I and it is representative of a tradition of collecting war trophies by the Australian nation and the British Empire.

The place is important in demonstrating aesthetic characteristics and/or a high degree of creative or technical achievement in New South Wales.

The Emden Gun has local aesthetic significance as a publicly visible item and distinctive monument at the entry point to the south east corner of Hyde Park. The memorial has visual and physical links to the ANZAC Memorial and Pool of Reflection via views and paved pathways.

The place has a strong or special association with a particular community or cultural group in New South Wales for social, cultural or spiritual reasons.

The Emden Gun has state significance for its value, especially for the Royal Australian Navy, in representing the early development of the Australian naval tradition and national pride in the victory of the Allies over the German ship SMS Emden. The battle contributed to the perception of World War I as being a major contributor to the development of an independent identity for the nation by demonstrating Australia's capacity to have its own successful naval fleet. In this regard the Emden Gun is likely to have significance for a specific community of interest including the Australian navy and also to naval and war historians.

The Emden Gun also has state significance as a symbol of the birth of the Royal Australian Navy and what was perceived as the rewards of self-government (being victory and power).

The Emden Gun also has state significance as an early example of the use of trophy guns as memorials within the wider development of a national tradition of memorialising significant war time events and commemorating those people who have fought (and died for their country). Such monuments themselves then form important sites for participation by the wider community in commemorative events and ceremonies.

The place has potential to yield information that will contribute to an understanding of the cultural or natural history of New South Wales.

The Emden Gun has state significance as a resource for the study of early 20th century naval armaments of foreign navies, in particular iron 10.5 cm/40 calibre (4.1 inch) German Naval breach loading guns of the period (as fitted to the German raider SMS Emden). It forms part of a suite of Emden guns and gun parts with others located at HMAS Penguin at Mosman; the Naval Heritage Centre, Sydney; and the Naval War Memorial, Canberra.

The place possesses uncommon, rare or endangered aspects of the cultural or natural history of New South Wales.

The Emden Gun has state significance as one of only three largely complete guns of its type salvaged from the SMS Emden in Australia (there are only four examples of this type in the world). It has state significance as one of a limited number of large items salvaged from the SMS Emden still in existence today. It is also believed to be the first gun to be utilised for memorial purposes and has rarity value at a state level as a sizeable relic from the Royal Australian Navy's first ship-to-ship action and victory. The Emden Gun is the first naval war trophy of World War I.

The Emden Gun has national significance as one of only a small number of war trophies captured by Australia in the battles of the Western Front prior to 1916, due to both the outcomes of those early battles and the inability of soldiers to obtain many trophies when they withdrew from those campaigns.

The place is important in demonstrating the principal characteristics of a class of cultural or natural places/environments in New South Wales.

The Emden Gun has state significance as a representative of Australian war trophies relating to World War I. It is also representative of memorials created in the early phase of the development of the tradition of constructing of memorials to individuals and events in public places that arose in Australia in response to World War I and other important events or periods in building the Australian nation. The Emden Gun symbolises the early focus on conflict-specific monuments rather than more general sites of commemoration.

== See also ==
- List of Australian military memorials
