= HMS Fantome (1901) =

Sloop of the Royal Navy

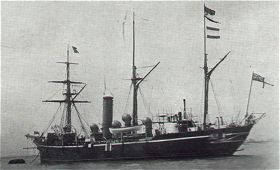
- Fantome in pre-war paint

History

United Kingdom
- Name: HMS Fantome
- Builder: Sheerness Dockyard, Kent
- Laid down: 8 January 1900
- Launched: 23 March 1901
- Christened: Miss Kennedy
- Commissioned: 5 June 1902
- Fate: Transferred to RAN

Australia
- Name: HMAS Fantome
- Acquired: 27 November 1914
- Recommissioned: 27 July 1915
- Decommissioned: 14 January 1919
- Fate: Transferred to RN

United Kingdom
- Name: HMS Fantome
- Acquired: April 1920
- Fate: Sold at Sydney on 30 January 1925

General characteristics
- Class & type: Cadmus-class sloop
- Displacement: 1,070 long tons (1,090 t)
- Length: 210 ft (64 m)
- Beam: 33 ft (10 m)
- Draught: 11.5 ft (3.5 m)
- Installed power: 1,400 hp (1,044 kW)
- Propulsion: Two Niclausse boilers; Two Babcock boilers; Three-cylinder vertical triple expansion steam engine; Twin screws
- Sail plan: Barquentine-rigged, later removed
- Endurance: 4,000 nmi (7,400 km) at 10 kn (19 km/h)
- Complement: 130
- Armament: As built: 6 × QF 4-inch (102 mm) guns; 4 × QF 3-pounder (47 mm) guns; Machine guns; For survey: 1 × 3-pounder QF gun; For WWI patrol duties: 2 × QF 4-inch (102 mm) guns; 4 × QF 12-pounder (76 mm) guns
- Armour: Protective deck of 1 to 1.5 in (2.5 to 3.8 cm) steel over machinery and boilers

HMS Fantome was an Cadmus-class sloop launched in 1901, transferred to the Royal Australian Navy in 1914, returned to the Royal Navy in 1920, and sold in 1924. She was the fourth ship of the Royal Navy to bear the name, which is from the French fantôme, meaning "ghost".

== Design ==
Fantome was constructed of steel to a design by William White, the Royal Navy Director of Naval Construction. Propulsion was provided by a three-cylinder vertical triple expansion steam engine developing 1,400 horsepower (1,000 kW) and driving twin screws. The Cadmus class was an evolution of the Condor-class sloop, carrying more coal, which in turn gave a greater length and displacement. This class comprised the very last screw sloops built for the Royal Navy.

=== Sail plan ===
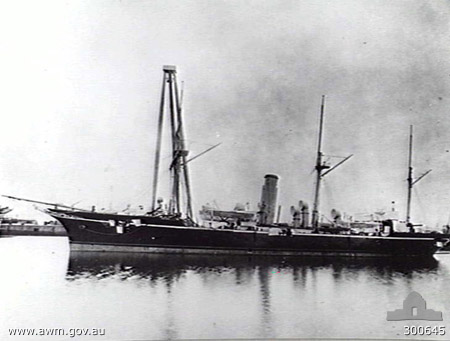
Fantome with sails removed and gantry erected c.1909

As designed and built the class was fitted with a barquentine-rigged sailplan. After Condor was lost in a gale in 1901, the Admiralty abandoned sails entirely. Fantome had a gantry erected over her fore-mast sometime prior to 1909, which would have prevented use of her sails.

=== Armament ===
The class was armed with six 4 in/25-pdr (1 ton) quick-firing Mk III breechloaders and four 3-pounder quick-firing breechloaders, as well as several machine guns. Fantome had her armament reduced to two QF 3-pounders for survey work, and later increased again for patrol work during World War I.

=== Construction ===
HMS Fantome was laid down at Sheerness Royal Dockyard in Kent on 8 January 1900, and launched on 23 March 1901 when she was christened by Miss Kennedy, daughter of Vice-Admiral Sir William Kennedy, Commander-in-Chief, The Nore. She was fitted with two Niclausse boilers manufactured by Messrs Humphrys and Tennant.

== Operational history ==
Fantome was commissioned at Sheerness Dockyard on 5 June 1902 by Commander Hugh Thomas Hibbert, with a complement of 113 officers and men, for service on the North America and West Indies Station. She arrived at the station head quarters at Halifax, Nova Scotia, on 13 October 1902, and later the same month visited the other head quarters at Bermuda, before going to Saint Lucia. After running ashore, a court of inquiry was reported in early 1903 to exonerate her commander as the chart which he had was wrong.

=== Venezuelan Affair ===
While serving on the North America and West Indies Station in late 1902 and early 1903, she took part in enforcing a blockade of the Venezuelan coast, where the Royal Navy contingent was led by Commodore Montgomerie in Charybdis.

After the end of this conflict, she returned with other ships to Trinidad in late February 1903, then to Grenada.

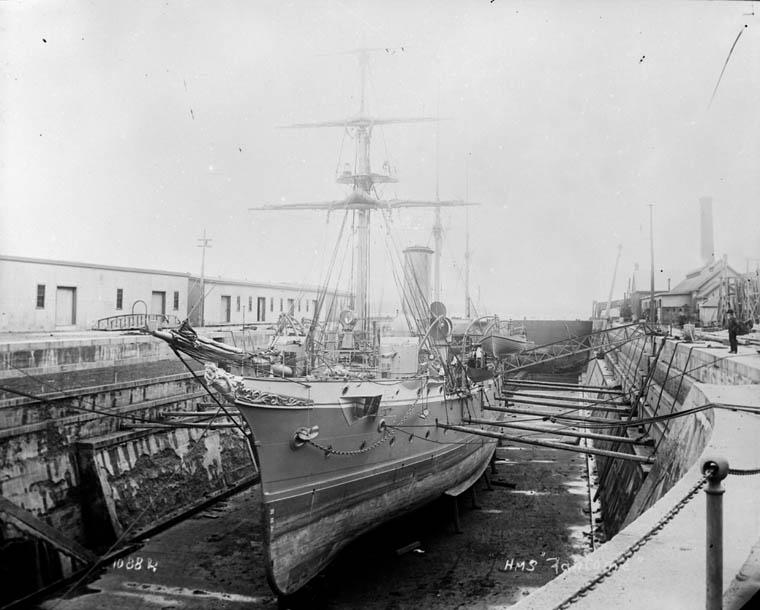
Fantome in dry dock at Halifax c.1903

=== Survey ship ===
From 1906, HMS Fantome was operated by the Royal Naval survey service and conducted survey operations in Australian waters until the outbreak of war in 1914.

=== Transfer to the Royal Australian Navy ===
The ship was transferred to the Royal Australian Navy on 27 November 1914 and commissioned as HMAS Fantome, but was paid off in February 1915. She was recommissioned on 27 July 1915 as a patrol vessel armed with two 4-inch and four 12-pounder guns.

From September 1915 to September 1917, she operated in the Bay of Bengal and South China Sea as part of the Far East Patrol. The duty was broadly uneventful and monotonous, and only concluded after the United States entered the war. Conditions aboard were hot and cramped, vermin were rife, supplies were of low quality, and in 1916, the sloop was plagued with influenza; at one point only 19 of the 88 enlisted personnel were fit for duty. In addition, the ship's commanding officer was both a strict disciplinarian and had little understanding of disciplinary regulations, and had been advised on several occasions that he had overstepped boundaries. In mid 1917, the commanding officer initiated drilling practice, which was seen as an additional hardship by the sailors, particularly the overworked engine room personnel. On 26 July, eight of the fifteen off-duty stokers disobeyed orders to assemble for practice, while the engine room personnel about to go on duty refused to do so until drilling practice ceased. The eight off-duty and four of the on-duty stokers were arrested and charged with mutiny: they were sentenced by court martial to two years imprisonment in Goulburn Gaol, although the sentences were later commuted. The commanding officer was criticised for his treatment of the ship's company considering the conditions they were operating in, and the British Admiralty organised the assignment of ten recruits to the ship to assist the engine room personnel.

From late 1917, Fantome was based at Suva, Fiji and operated in the South Pacific performing police duties. She conducted a punitive raid on Malekula in the New Hebrides in October 1918.

=== Return to the Royal Navy ===
Fantome paid off on 14 January 1919 and was recommissioned into the Royal Navy in April 1920 for service as a survey ship. After being converted for survey duties, the ship was heavily overcrowded (a vessel designed with a ship's company of 113 was required to carry 134 personnel in addition to surveying equipment), and post-war personnel shortages meant that a little over half the number of sailors required for general seaman duties were aboard. In November 1920, after three months surveying work on the Great Barrier Reef, Fantome returned to Cairns. The overworked general seamen hit the town hard, with seven court-martialled for drunkenness and related behaviour, while another nine deserted. An inquiry concluded that the age and condition of the sloop was inappropriate for the expected duties, and the ship was marked for replacement at earliest opportunity.

== Decommissioning and fate ==
Fantome operated in Australian waters until she was paid off for disposal on 17 April 1924. Survey duties in Australian waters were taken over by HMAS Moresby.

The ship was sold for scrap at Sydney on 30 January 1925. Her hull was stripped to a bare hulk and used as a barge, mainly in Tasmania. She was finally sold for demolition in 1956.
