= HMS Shearwater (1900) =

Sloop of the Royal Navy

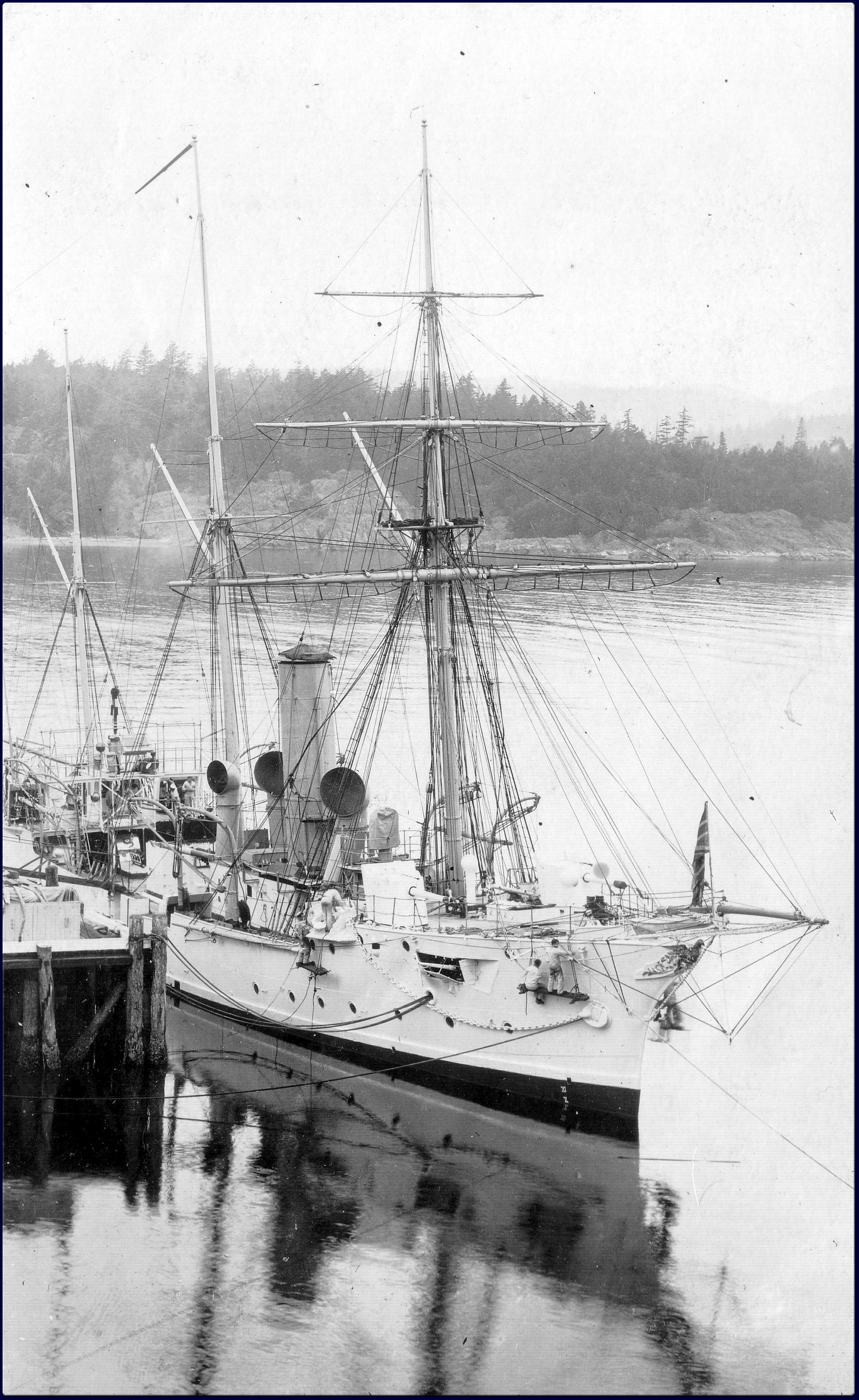
- HMS Shearwater at Esquimalt circa 1908.

History

United Kingdom
- Name: HMS Shearwater
- Builder: HM Dockyard, Sheerness
- Laid down: 1 February 1899
- Launched: 10 February 1900
- Christened: Lady Bowden-Smith
- Commissioned: 1900
- Fate: Transferred to Royal Canadian Navy, 1915

Canada
- Name: HMCS Shearwater
- Acquired: 1915
- Decommissioned: 13 June 1919
- Fate: Sold in May 1922

Canada
- Name: Vedas
- Operator: Western Shipping Company
- Acquired: May 1922
- Fate: Scrapped 1937

General characteristics
- Class & type: Condor-class sloop
- Displacement: 980 tons
- Length: 204 ft (62 m) oa; 180 ft (55 m) pp
- Beam: 33 ft (10 m) (Note: The first ships of the class were 32 ft 6 in (9.91 m) in beam, with the last four widened by 6 inches)
- Draught: 11 ft 6 in (3.51 m)
- Installed power: 1,400 hp (1,044 kW)
- Propulsion: 4 × Belleville boilers; Three-cylinder vertical triple expansion steam engine; Twin screws
- Sail plan: Barque-rigged, changed to barquentine-rigged, later removed
- Speed: 13 kn (24 km/h) under power
- Endurance: 3,000 nmi (5,600 km) at 10 kn (19 km/h)
- Complement: 120–130
- Armament: As HMS Shearwater: 6 × QF 4-inch (102 mm) guns; 4 × QF 3-pounder (47 mm) guns; As HMCS Shearwater: 4 × QF 4-inch (102 mm) guns; 4 × QF 3-pounder (47 mm) guns
- Armour: Protective deck of 1 in (2.5 cm) to 1 1/2 in (3.8 cm) steel over machinery and boilers.

HMS Shearwater was a Condor-class sloop launched in 1900. She served on the Royal Navy's Pacific Station and in 1915 was transferred to the Royal Canadian Navy as HMCS Shearwater, serving as a submarine depot ship until 1919. She was sold to the Western Shipping Company in May 1922 and renamed Vedas.

== Construction and design ==
Shearwater was laid down at Sheerness Dockyard on 1 February 1899, and floated out of dock when she was launched on 10 February 1900 by Lady Bowden-Smith, wife of Sir Nathaniel Bowden-Smith, Commander-in-Chief, The Nore. The ship had a length overall of 204 feet (62 m) and was 180 feet (55 m) between perpendiculars. Shearwater had a beam of 33 feet (10 m) and a draught of 11 feet 6 inches (3.51 m). The ship displaced 980 tons and had a complement of 130.

The Condor class was constructed of steel to a design by William White, the Royal Navy Director of Naval Construction. The bridge was located on the poop deck and the ships were designed with a clipper bow and a slightly raked funnel. Shearwater was powered by a Thames Iron Works three-cylinder vertical triple-expansion steam engine developing 1,400 indicated horsepower (1,000 kW) from four Belleville boilers and driving twin screws. This gave the ships a maximum speed of 13 knots (24 km/h; 15 mph) under power with a range of 3,000 nautical miles (5,600 km; 3,500 mi) at 10 knots (19 km/h; 12 mph).

=== Sail plan ===
The class was originally designed and built with barque-rigged sails, although some pictures show ships of the class with a barquentine rig. Condor was lost in a gale during her first commission, and the contemporary gunnery pioneer Admiral Percy Scott ascribes her sinking to the encumbrance of sails, and furthermore believed that her loss finally convinced that Admiralty to abandon sails entirely. All other ships of the class had their sails removed during the first few years of the twentieth century.

=== Armament and armour ===
The class was armed with six 4-inch/25 pdr (1 ton) quick-firing breech loaders and four 3-pounder quick-firing breech loaders. The guns were arranged with two on the forecastle, two amidships and two aft. In 1914, two of her 4-inch guns were landed and used to defend Seymour Narrows in British Columbia after the First World War broke out.

The Condor class had a protective deck of 1–1 1/2 in (2.5–3.8 cm) to steel over machinery and boilers. The guns were equipped with gun shields which had .22 in (5.6 mm) armour.

== Service history ==
=== Royal Navy ===
Shearwater was commissioned at Chatham 24 October 1901 by Commander Charles Henry Umfreville, with a complement of 104 officers and men. She left the Nore in early November to relieve Icarus on the Royal Navy's Pacific Station. In July 1902 she toured the Bering Sea, and in November that year she visited Honolulu, followed by a visit to Fanning Island in December, then Tahiti and Pitcairn Islands before meeting the commander of the Pacific station at Coquimbo in early February 1903.

The station itself was suspended in 1905, and the facilities at Esquimalt, British Columbia passed to the Canadian Department of Marine and Fisheries. Shearwater and Algerine remained at Esquimalt, and in 1910 the Naval Service Bill was passed, creating the Royal Canadian Navy. Shearwater recommissioned, still as a Royal Navy vessel, at Esquimalt on 27 November 1912. At the onset of the First World War, Algerine and Shearwater were deployed as part of an international squadron off the coast of Mexico, protecting foreign interests during their civil war. Two German cruisers, SMS Leipzig and SMS Nurnberg were reported on the west coast of North America on 4 August 1914 when news of the war broke. HMCS Rainbow was ordered south to cover their withdrawal to Esquimalt, all ships arriving safely a week later.

=== Royal Canadian Navy service ===
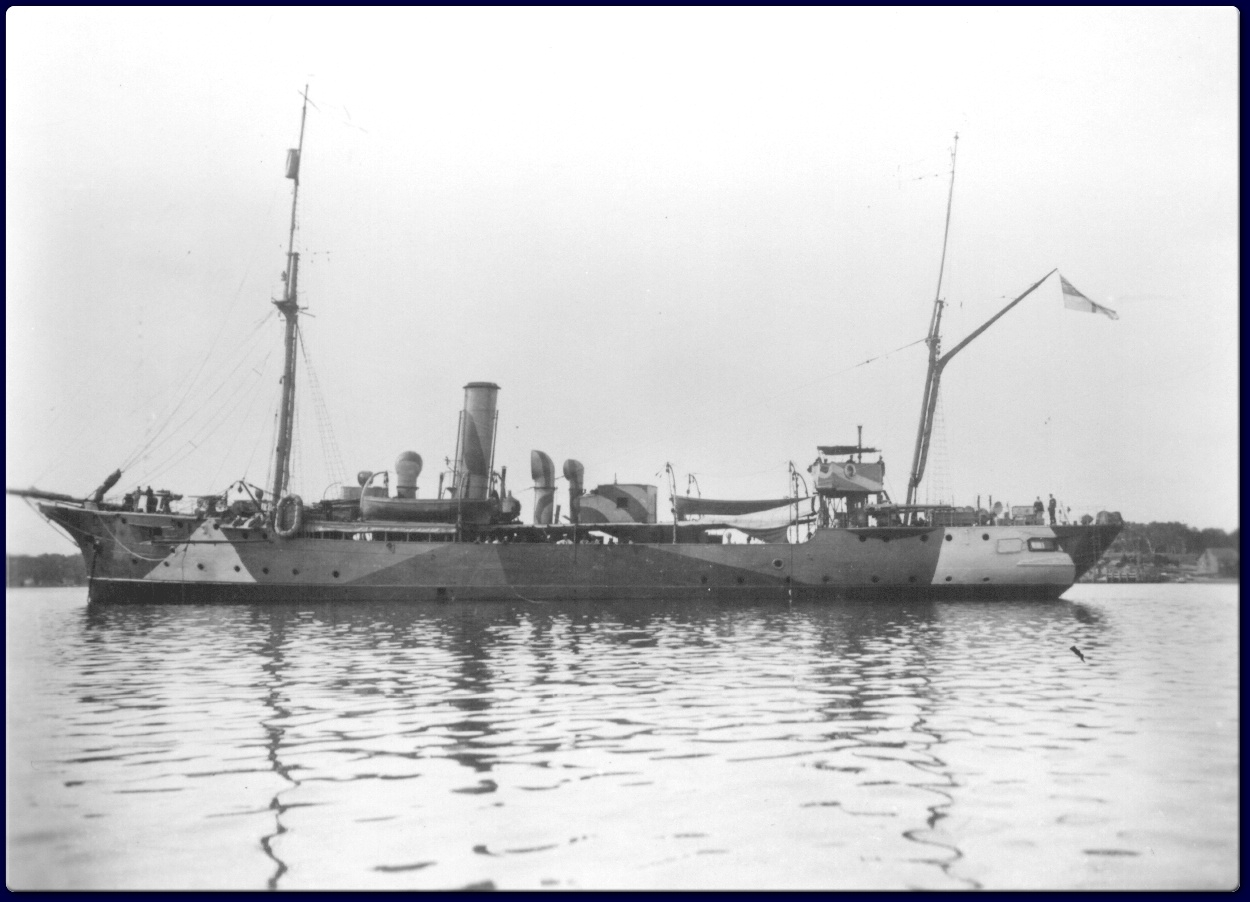
HMCS Shearwater c. 1918

After arriving at Esquimalt, two of Shearwater's 4-inch guns were taken ashore and used with a shore battery position to defend the Seymour Narrows, while the crew of Shearwater was sent to Halifax, Nova Scotia to man HMCS Niobe, which was short of trained sailors.

After discussions between the Royal Canadian Navy and the Admiralty Shearwater recommissioned on 8 September 1914 as a submarine tender for the Canadian CC-class submarines at Esquimalt. She was transferred permanently in 1915 to the Royal Canadian Navy, becoming HMCS Shearwater.

In 1917 Shearwater escorted the two submarines to Halifax, transiting through the Panama Canal. For the remainder of the war, she saw very limited duty as a Royal Canadian Navy support vessel on the Atlantic coast, mostly spent training with the CC-class submarines in Baddeck Bay.

Shearwater was paid off from the Royal Canadian Navy on 13 June 1919. She was sold to the Western Shipping Company in May 1922 and renamed Vedas. Her register was closed in 1937 and she was broken up at Windsor, Ontario.
