= Lorna Thomas =

Australian cricketer and manager

Personal information
- Full name: Lorna Pauline Thomas
- Born: 1st of December, 1917
- Died: 17th of September, 2014

Lorna Pauline Thomas MBE (1 December 1917 – 17 September 2014) was an

Australian cricketer from the 1930s to the 1950s and Australian team manager from 1963 to 1978.

Lorna Thomas (née McCarthy) was first selected to play for the New South Wales women's cricket team in 1937. In the 1940s, she represented NSW against New Zealand and England.

After her playing career, Thomas managed the NSW and Australian women's cricket teams. She was the manager of the tour of New Zealand in 1960–61, the tour of England in 1963, the tour of New Zealand in 1971–72, the Australian team at the 1973 Women's Cricket World Cup. and the tour of England in 1976. She received the MBE in 1978 for services to women's cricket.

She worked as a nurse in the New South Wales prison system, looking after the welfare of the women in the holding cells at Sydney Central Police Station. On 17 September 2014, Thomas died at the age of 96.
