= HMS Fantome =

Five ships of the Royal Navy have borne the name HMS Fantome, after the French word Fantôme, meaning 'ghost':

- HMS Fantome (1810) was an 18-gun French privateer brig-sloop, captured in 1810 by HMS Melampus and wrecked in 1814.
- HMS Fantome (1839) was a 16-gun Acorn-class brig-sloop launched in 1839 and sold in 1864.
- HMS Fantome (1873) was a composite Fantome-class screw sloop launched in 1873 and sold in 1889.
- HMS Fantome (1901) was a Cadmus-class sloop launched in 1901. She was used as a survey ship from 1906 and was sold in 1925.
- HMS Fantome (J224) was an Algerine-class minesweeper launched in 1942 and scrapped in 1947.
