= HMS Cadmus (1903) =

Sloop of the Royal Navy

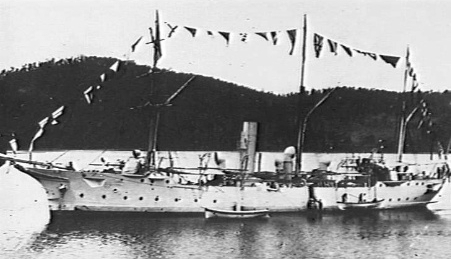
- Sister ship Clio dressed overall at Tasmania in 1905

History

United Kingdom
- Name: HMS Cadmus
- Builder: Sheerness Dockyard
- Cost: £76,657
- Laid down: 11 March 1902
- Launched: 29 April 1903
- Commissioned: 1904
- Fate: Sold for scrap, 1 September 1921

General characteristics
- Class & type: Cadmus-class sloop
- Displacement: 1,070 long tons (1,087 t)
- Length: 210 ft (64 m) oa; 185 ft (56 m) pp
- Beam: 33 ft (10.1 m)
- Draught: 11 ft 3 in (3.4 m)
- Installed power: 1,400 ihp (1,000 kW)
- Propulsion: Three-cylinder vertical triple-expansion steam engine; Coal-fired Niclausse boilers; Twin screws
- Speed: 13 kn (24 km/h; 15 mph)
- Range: 3,000 nmi (5,600 km) at 10 kn (19 km/h)
- Complement: 150
- Armament: 6 × QF 4-inch (102 mm) guns; 4 × QF 3-pounder (47 mm) guns; 3 × machine guns

HMS Cadmus was a Cadmus-class sloop of the Royal Navy. She was launched at Sheerness, England in 1903 and spent her entire career in the Far East. She was sold in Hong Kong in 1921.

== Design ==
Cadmus was constructed of copper-sheathed steel to a design by William White, the Royal Navy Director of Naval Construction. Her propulsion was provided by a J. Samuel White three-cylinder vertical triple expansion steam engine developing 1,400 horsepower (1,000 kW) and driving twin screws. She and her sisters were an evolution of the Condor-class sloop, carrying more coal, which in turn gave a greater length and displacement. This class comprised the very last screw sloops built for the Royal Navy, and Espiegle was the last Royal Navy ship built with a figurehead. Her sister ship Espiegle was the last to sport a figurehead till her breaking up in 1923.

=== Sail plan ===
As designed and built the class was fitted with a barquentine-rigged sail plan. After HMS Condor was lost in a gale in 1901, the Admiralty abandoned sails entirely. Espiegle was never fitted with sails, and the rest of the class had their yards removed in 1914. The official attitude to sails and the loss of yards did not completely prevent the use of sails, and log entries show that fore-and-aft sails were being used in Odin as late as April 1920.

=== Armament ===
The class was armed with six 4-inch/25-pdr (1ton) quick-firing breechloaders and four 3-pounder quick-firing breechloaders, as well as several machine guns.

== Construction ==
Cadmus was laid down at Sheerness Dockyard on 11 March 1902, and launched on 29 April 1903. She was commissioned in 1904 for the Far East.

== Service history ==
Cadmus started her career on the Australia Station, where she arrived on 13 July 1904; her maiden voyage to Australia was accomplished in record time for a sloop. She was refitted at Cockatoo Island Dockyard, Sydney in 1905.

In May 1905, she was ordered to follow Clio to the China Station and served there for the rest of her career. She recommissioned at Hong Kong on 18 October 1912, and remained on the China Station during World War I. In November 1914 she arrived at Direction Island in the Indian Ocean a week after the battle between Emden and Sydney to bury the sailors killed in action. She was in Singapore during the Sepoy Mutiny of February 1915, and her crew was involved in capturing the mutineers. In 1920, she was listed as "unallocated" at Hong Kong.

== Fate ==
She was sold in Hong Kong on September 1, 1921.
