= HMS Clio (1903) =

Sloop of the Royal Navy

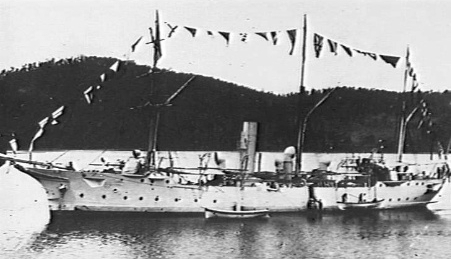
- Clio dressed overall at Tasmania in 1905

History

United Kingdom
- Name: HMS Clio
- Namesake: The Greek muse Clio
- Builder: Sheerness Dockyard
- Laid down: 11 March 1902
- Launched: 14 March 1903
- Completed: 1904
- Fate: Scrapped, 1920

General characteristics
- Class & type: Cadmus-class sloop
- Displacement: 1,070 long tons (1,087 t)
- Length: 185 ft (56.4 m)
- Beam: 33 ft (10.1 m)
- Draught: 11 ft 3 in (3.4 m)
- Installed power: 1,400 ihp (1,000 kW)
- Propulsion: 2 shafts, vertical triple-expansion steam engines; Coal-fired Niclausse boilers
- Speed: 13 knots (24 km/h; 15 mph)
- Complement: 150
- Armament: 6 × QF 4-inch (102 mm) guns; 4 × QF 3-pounder (47 mm) guns; 3 × machine guns

HMS Clio was a Cadmus-class sloop of the Royal Navy. She was launched in 1903, saw active service in the Middle East during World War I, was briefly involved in the 1920 British Somaliland campaign and was sold at Bombay in 1920.

== Construction ==
Her keel was laid down at Sheerness dockyard on 11 March 1902, and she was launched on 14 March 1903.

== Service history ==
=== Australia station ===
Clio started her career on the Australia Station, where she arrived in May 1904. In July she made an Island trip and visited Nouméa, Suva, Tonga. The visit was in connection with the proposal of the Admiralty to examine the various reefs in the Cook and other groups, to make safe entrances for the surf boats, discharging and loading cargo. After visiting Mangain, Aitutaki, and other islands, the Clio proceeded to Tahiti. After blasting passages through the coral reefs at Savage Island and other islands she reached Auckland in September and stayed for two months in New Zealand waters. Planning to return to Sydney for Christmas, she visited Fiji again, where she stayed at the disposal of the Governor because of political problems at Tonga, to which she made some tours. In February she finally returned to Sydney.

=== China station ===
After a visit to Hobart Clio left Australia in April 1905 for the China Station.

In 1908, the Clio transported British journalist Ernest Bethell from Chemulpo to Shanghai to serve a sentence of imprisonment for inciting Koreans to oppose Japanese rule of Korea.

=== World War I ===
She re-commissioned at Hong Kong in August 1914 and was initially based at Sandakan, tasked with patrolling the Basilan Straits. In late 1914 she transferred to the Middle East and was in Port Said by the beginning of January 1915. At the end of that month she moved into the Suez Canal and was active in the defence of the canal against Turkish troops. She fired on Turkish positions on 27 January and 1–3 February, receiving incoming rifle fire on the last. She was also hit by two heavier shells, but suffered no casualties. She formed part of the British expeditionary force in the Shatt-al-Arab in April 1915, and in 1917 served in operations off Aden in March. At Dhubab on 6 May and again on 8 May at Ibn Abbas (near the island of Kamaran) landings were carried out to punish smuggling.

=== Campaign against the "Mad Mullah" ===
In December 1919, after commissioning at Gibraltar, she took part in the campaign against Mohammed Abdullah Hassan ("the Mad Mullah"). Sailors were landed, but by late February the campaign was complete.

== Fate ==
She was sold at Bombay on 12 November 1920 on the same day as her sister-ship Odin.
