= HMS Mutine (1900) =

Sloop of the Royal Navy

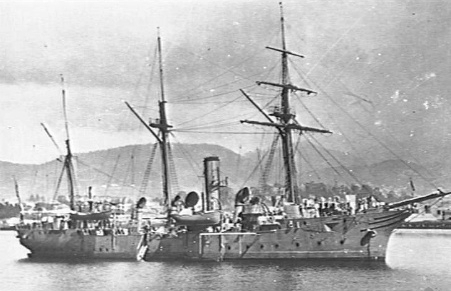
- HMS Mutine at Hobart in 1904

History

United Kingdom
- Name: HMS Mutine
- Builder: Laird Brothers & Co, Birkenhead
- Yard number: 635
- Laid down: 1898
- Launched: 1 March 1900
- Fate: Survey ship 1907; Depot ship, Bermuda, 1917; RNVR drill ship 1925; Sold for scrap, 16 August 1932

General characteristics
- Class & type: Condor-class sloop
- Displacement: 980 tons
- Length: 204 ft (62 m) oa; 180 ft (55 m) pp
- Beam: 33 ft (10 m) (Note: The first ships of the class were 32 ft 6 in (9.91 m) in beam, with the last four widened by 6 inches)
- Draught: 11 ft 6 in (3.51 m)
- Installed power: 1,400 hp (1,044 kW)
- Propulsion: 4 × Belleville boilers; Three-cylinder vertical triple expansion steam engine; Twin screws
- Sail plan: Barque-rigged, changed to barquentine-rigged, later removed
- Speed: 13 kn (24 km/h) under power
- Endurance: 3,000 nmi (5,600 km) at 10 kn (19 km/h)
- Complement: 120-130
- Armament: 6 × QF 4-inch (101.6 mm) 25-pdr guns; 4 × QF 3-pounder (47-mm) guns
- Armour: Protective deck of 1 in (2.5 cm) to 1 1/2 in (3.8 cm) steel over machinery and boilers.

HMS Mutine was a Condor-class sloop of the Royal Navy. Mutine was launched on 1 March 1900. While being delivered from Birkenhead to Portsmouth an accident in Mutine's boiler rooms caused some loss of life and gave her a name as an unlucky ship before her career even began. She served on the China Station, then the Australia Station between December 1903 and February 1905 and later became a survey ship, surviving until 1932 as a Royal Naval Volunteer Reserve drill ship, the last of her class to be sold.

== Design ==
Mutine was constructed of steel to a design by William White, the Royal Navy Director of Naval Construction. She was powered by a three-cylinder vertical triple expansion steam engine developing 1,400 horsepower (1,000 kW) and driving twin screws.

=== Sail plan ===
The class was originally designed and built with barque-rigged sails, although some pictures show ships of the class with a barquentine rig. Condor was lost in a gale during her first commission, and the contemporary gunnery pioneer Admiral Percy Scott ascribes her sinking to the encumbrance of sails, and furthermore believed that her loss finally convinced that Admiralty to abandon sails entirely. All other ships of the class had their sails removed during the first few years of the twentieth century.

=== Armament ===
The class was armed with six 4-inch/25-pounder (1 ton) quick-firing breech loaders and four 3-pounder quick-firing breech loaders.

== Service ==
Mutine was launched at Birkenhead on 1 March 1900, and commissioned later the same year. She was re-commissioned at Sheerness 28 November 1901 by Commander Claude William Manners Plenderleath, with a complement of 105 officers and men, for service on the China Station. After successful steam trials in the North Sea, she left Sheerness for China in mid December, arriving at Singapore 4 February, and at Hong Kong 27 March 1902. She served in the Far East between December 1903 and February 1905 and was converted to a survey ship in May 1907. After a year operating off the west coast of Africa, Mutine returned to Devonport for a refit in July 1908.

She was a depot ship in Bermuda from December 1917 and an RNVR drill ship from 1925.

== Fate ==
Mutine was sold to Thos. W. Ward of Briton Ferry on 16 August 1932 and scrapped.
