= Central Local Court House, Sydney =

Heritage-listed building in Sydney, Australia

Central Local Court House
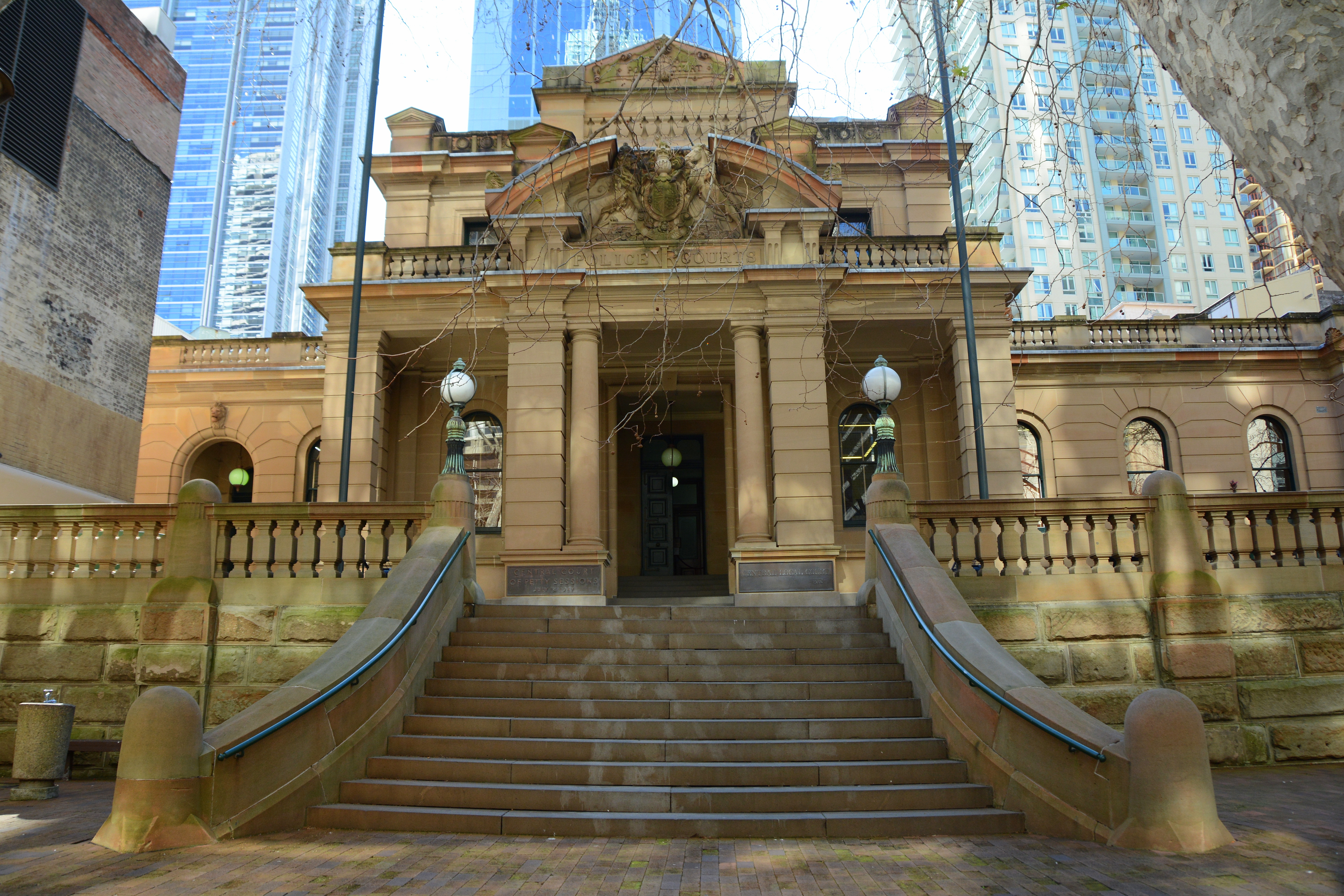

- Location within Sydney
- Alternative names: Police Law Courts; Central Police Court

General information
- Status: Completed
- Type: Court house (and former police station)
- Architectural style: Federation Free Classical
- Location: 98 Liverpool Street, Sydney central business district, City of Sydney, New South Wales, Australia
- Coordinates: 33°52′34″S 151°12′25″E
- Completed: 1892
- Owner: Government of New South Wales
- Landlord: Department of Justice

Technical details
- Material: Sandstone; internal timber joinery

Design and construction
- Architects: James Barnet (designer); Walter Liberty Vernon (supervised construction)
- Architecture firm: Colonial Architect of New South Wales

Website
- Central Court House, Sydney

New South Wales Heritage Register
- Official name: Sydney Central Local Court House; Police Law Courts; Central Police Court
- Type: State heritage (built)
- Designated: 2 April 1999
- Reference no.: 802
- Type: Courthouse
- Category: Law Enforcement
- Builders: Phippard Brothers

The Central Local Court House or Police Law Courts or Central Police Court is a heritage-listed building located at 98 Liverpool Street, in the central business district of Sydney, New South Wales in Australia. Constructed in the Federation Free Classical style based on original designs by Colonial Architect, James Barnet, the building was completed in 1892 under the supervision of Barnet's successor, Government Architect, Walter Liberty Vernon.

It is also known as Sydney Central Local Court House, Police Law Courts and Central Police Court. The property is owned by the Department of Justice, a department of the Government of New South Wales. It was added to the New South Wales State Heritage Register in 1999. The court house is located in a precinct that includes the Downing Centre, and buildings housing the Family Court of Australia and the Federal Circuit Court in Sydney. Adjacent to the court house is Brickfield Place, a brick paved courtyard with seating and planter boxes, constructed in 1892, assessed as a good example of urban design for public open space.

== History ==
The Central Local Court House was designed by the Government Architect Walter Liberty Vernon in 1892. Historical period; 1876 - 1900.

== Description ==
=== Site & Forecourt ===
The Court has a large terraced forecourt facing south to Liverpool Street. The parcel of land on which the court sits runs north to Central Street. The terraced outdoor areas to the street frontage feature carved sandstone balustrades and grand entrance staircase.

=== Court House ===
The Central Local Court House is a robust and highly decorated public building designed in the Federation Free Classical Style. The use of a formal symmetrical floor plan and massing with classically delivered carved sandstone details, including a coat of arms, which communicates the authoritative status of the legal system in the late 19th century. Other accommodation include Associate's accommodation, prisoner holding facilities, foyer, four majestic Court Chambers, three legal rooms, general office, Chamber Magistrate's office, and Sheriffs office.

The Central Local Court House is constructed in smooth dressed sandstone blocks. It is embellished with carved sandstone decorative elements. Much internal timber joinery and furniture remains intact. The site comprises a number of auxiliary buildings associated with the court house, including a small caretaker's cottage.

=== Caretaker's Cottage ===
on the eastern boundary of the site. Two storey rendered brick structure, with two chimneys and windows and outlook directed over the central forecourt of the court house.

== Heritage listing ==
As of October 2008, the Central Local Courthouse is of State historical significance as the first purpose-built police court with the State Justice system and first petty Sessions Court. The building is a fine and intact example of a classically inspired public building designed in the Federation Free Classical style by James Barnet, the last colonial architect, with construction supervised by Walter Liberty Vernon, the first government architect. The building is an example of a court that operated in association with a police station and significantly has continued to operate with attached holding cells complex to the present day.

The Central Local Courthouse and Holding Cells are good examples of late nineteenth-century courthouse and prison environment that despite alterations and modification demonstrate certain design philosophies and standards of that time. The form and relationship of the Holding Cells are functional and reflect Barnet's preference to relate each building to its site and context. The design of the courthouse and its principal façade connotes typical characteristics of this type of building. The buildings remain as a good and intact example of a courthouse and associated facilities designed by the Colonial Architects Office and that demonstrate the growing affluence and prosperity of the time.

Central Local Courts and Holding Cells are of social significance for their on-going association with the police, Attorney General's Department, Department of Corrective Services, NSW Sherriff's office and all associated parties who have used the building for over 100 years. The building significantly continues to operate and is part of a network of courts in the local area.

Central Local Court House, Sydney was listed on the New South Wales State Heritage Register in April 1999.

== See also ==
- Australian non-residential architectural styles
- Sydney Central Police Station
