= Cadmus-class sloop =

1900 class of British screw sloops

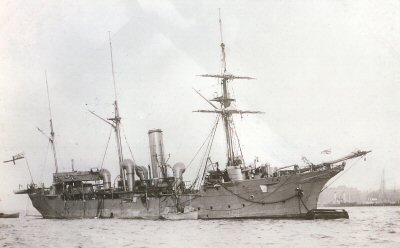
- HMS Merlin at a buoy in grey wartime paint

Class overview
- Name: Cadmus-class sloop
- Builders: Sheerness Dockyard
- Operators: Royal Navy; Royal Australian Navy
- Preceded by: Condor-class sloop
- Succeeded by: Flower-class sloop
- Cost: £80,796 (Clio); £76,657 (Cadmus)
- Built: 1900–1903
- In commission: 1900–1925
- Completed: 6
- Retired: 6

General characteristics
- Type: Screw steel sloop
- Displacement: 1,070 long tons (1,087 t)
- Length: 210 ft (64 m) oa; 185 ft (56 m) pp
- Beam: 33 ft (10.1 m)
- Draught: 11 ft 3 in (3.4 m)
- Installed power: 1,400 ihp (1,000 kW)
- Propulsion: Three-cylinder vertical triple-expansion steam engine; Coal-fired Niclausse boilers; Twin screws
- Speed: 13 kn (24 km/h; 15 mph)
- Range: 3,000 nmi (5,600 km) at 10 kn (19 km/h)
- Complement: 150
- Armament: 6 × QF 4 in (102 mm) guns; 4 × 3-pounder guns; 3 × machine guns

The Cadmus class was a six-ship class of 10-gun screw steel sloops built at Sheerness Dockyard for the Royal Navy between 1900 and 1903. This was the last class of the Victorian Navy's multitude of sloops, gunvessels and gunboats to be constructed, and they followed the traditional pattern for 'colonial' small warships, with a full rig of sails. After them, the "Fisher Reforms" of the Navy ended the construction and deployment of this type of vessel. All of the class survived until the 1920s, remaining on colonial stations during World War I.

== Design ==
The Cadmus class was constructed of copper-sheathed steel to a design by William White, the Royal Navy Director of Naval Construction. Propulsion was provided by a three-cylinder vertical triple expansion steam engine developing 1,400 horsepower (1,000 kW) and driving twin screws. They were an evolution of the Condor-class sloop, carrying more coal, which in turn gave a greater length and displacement. This class comprised the very last screw sloops built for the Royal Navy, and Espiegle was the last Royal Navy ship to sport a figurehead until she was broken up, although photos of the other ships in this class also show them with figureheads. The last ship built with a figurehead was HMS Cadmus

=== Sail plan ===
As designed and built the class was fitted with a barquentine-rigged sail plan. After HMS Condor was lost in a gale in 1901, the Admiralty abandoned sails entirely. Espiegle was never fitted with sails, and the rest of the class had their yards removed in 1914. The official attitude to sails and the loss of yards did not completely prevent the use of sails, and log entries show that fore-and-aft sails were being used in Odin as late as April 1920.

=== Armament ===
The class was armed with six 4-inch/25-pounder (1ton) quick-firing breech loaders and four 3-pounder quick-firing breech loaders, as well as several machine guns. Fantome had her armament reduced to two QF 3-pounders for survey work.

== Ships ==
| Name | Ship Builder | Launched | Fate |
|---|---|---|---|
| Espiegle | Sheerness Dockyard | 8 December 1900 | Sold at Bombay on 17 September 1923 |
| Fantome | Sheerness Dockyard | 23 March 1901 | Survey ship 1906, sold at Sydney 30 January 1925 |
| Merlin | Sheerness Dockyard | 30 November 1901 | Survey ship 1906, sold at Hong Kong on 3 August 1923 |
| Odin | Sheerness Dockyard | 30 November 1901 | Sold at Bombay on 12 November 1920 |
| Clio | Sheerness Dockyard | 14 March 1903 | Sold at Bombay on 12 November 1920 |
| Cadmus | Sheerness Dockyard | 29 April 1903 | Sold at Hong Kong on 1 September 1921 |

== Operational histories ==
The design of the Cadmus class differed from the screw sloops of the 1860s only in an evolutionary sense. Although constructed of steel and armed with quick-loading guns, they retained the sails and layout of the earlier vessels. By the turn of the twentieth century, they were thoroughly obsolete. The overseas stations of the Royal Navy were responsible for patrolling the maritime British Empire, and these ships were intended for that role. The rapidity with which they were sold or converted to survey ships gives testament to their out-moded design. According to Hansard, it was stated by the Secretary to the Admiralty in Parliament on 6 March 1905 that

they were never designed for fighting purposes but for subsidiary work in peace or war, for which they are still available, and in which they are at the present moment engaged

=== HMS Espiegle ===
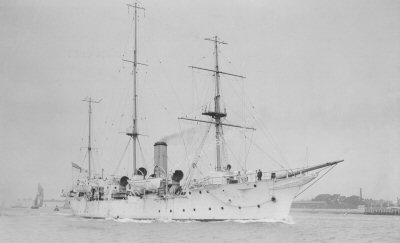
HMS Espiegle c. 1910 under power

On commissioning, Espiegle joined the China Station. Due to the threat to British subjects and interests in Yingkou (then known as Niuzhuang) from the Russo-Japanese War, she was sent to the Liao River during 1903–1904, where she wintered in the river in a mud dock dug out for her. Once the ice had melted, she made passage to Weihaiwei, passing Port Arthur at daylight on 13 April 1904, witnessing exchanges of fire between Japanese and Russian ships.

By 1914, Espiegle was on the East Indies Station. She took part in the operations in the Shatt-al-Arab in November 1914 with Odin and Clio, reaching as far as Basra. She was sold at Bombay on 17 September 1923.

=== HMS Fantome ===
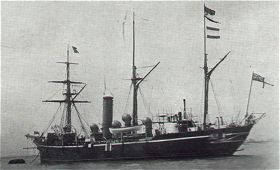
Fantome in pre-war paint

Fantome served on the North America and West Indies Station, including a period in late 1902 and early 1903 when, under Commodore Montgomerie in HMS Charybdis, she enforced a blockade of the Venezuelan coast. From 1906, Fantome was operated by the Royal Navy Survey Service and conducted survey operations in Australian waters until the outbreak of war in 1914. She was transferred to the Royal Australian Navy on 27 November 1914 as a patrol vessel armed with two 4-inch (100 mm) and four 12-pounder guns. From September 1915 to September 1917, she operated in the Bay of Bengal and South China Sea, and from late 1917 was based at Suva, Fiji performing police duties. She conducted a punitive raid on Malekula in the New Hebrides in October 1918. Fantome was returned to the Royal Navy in April 1920 for service as a survey ship, remaining in Australian waters until she paid off in April 1924. She was sold for scrap at Sydney on 30 January 1925, hulked and used as a barge, mainly in Tasmania. She was finally sold for demolition in 1956.

=== HMS Merlin ===
In 1904, Merlin took part in the 4th expedition of the Somaliland Campaign against the Mad Mullah. The naval force included HM Ships Hyacinth, Perseus, Fox, Mohawk, and Porpoise. From 1906, Merlin was employed as a survey ship, conducting hydrographic work both at home and abroad. She re-commissioned at Hong Kong on 5 November 1913, and continued to work as a survey vessel, for which her armament was reduced. She was sold at Hong Kong on 3 August 1923.

=== HMS Odin ===
Odin spent the first part of her life at the South Atlantic Station. On 23 January 1904, she called at the isolated island of Tristan da Cunha, carrying Mr William Hammond Tooke with an offer to the islanders;

Should all the inhabitants wish to leave the Island, the Cape and Home Governments would provide them with a free passage, purchase their live stock from them and settle them within 100 miles (160 km) of Cape Town, allowing them about 2 acres (8,100 m^{2}) of land on rent, and would advance them money on loan to start their homes... They would be near the sea coast, where they would be able to start fisheries to supply the people of Cape Town... and that in future they could not rely on a yearly visit from a man-of-war

After vaccinating children, conducting a census (74 people) and baptising a child, they received the answer of the inhabitants: three families were for, seven against, and one neutral. The offer was therefore withdrawn, and the ship carried only one passenger to the Cape, a Mrs. Amy Matilda Hagan. Odin steamed for Nightingale Island and Inaccessible Island, before returning to the Cape. By 1909, Odin had become a drill ship for the Cape Naval Volunteers, but by March 1914 had recommissioned at Muscat for service on the East Indies Station.

October 1914 saw Odin, Espiegle, and Dalhousie protecting the Abadan Island oil refineries at the northern end of the Persian Gulf. On 7 October, the Turkish Government delivered a formal letter to Espiegle protesting at the violation of Turkish waters within the Shatt-al-Arab. An uneasy peace was sustained until 31 October, when Espiegle learnt that the Turkish Navy had shelled Odessa, thus effectively declaring war. On 5 November, Great Britain officially declared war on the Ottoman Empire, and on 6 November, Espiegle engaged a series of trenches opposite Abadan Island. On 21 November, Espiegle and Odin bypassed a sunken barrage in the Shatt-al-Arab and steamed as far as Basra. A naval landing party put an end to looting in the city. Odin and Espiegle supported British and Indian Troops in engagements near Basra, firing on Turkish positions. Beyond Basra the waters of the Shatt-al-Arab are too shallow for all but the smallest vessels, and the naval contribution to the Mesopotamian campaign was taken over by an improvised fleet of tugs and paddle steamers

Odin continued to serve on the East Indies Station, and near Aden on 5 March 1917, she pursued the German raider Iltis, which was scuttled rather than be captured. Odin was sold at Bombay on 12 November 1920 on the same day as Clio.

=== HMS Clio ===
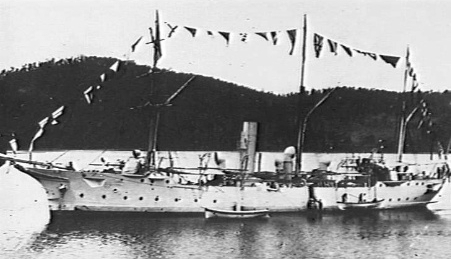
Clio dressed overall at Tasmania in 1905

Clio started her career on the Australia Station, where she arrived in April 1904 after a journey with many problems. She served there for eleven months and then went on to the China Station in April 1905.

In August 1914, Clio re-commissioned at Hong Kong. She was initially based at Sandakan and was tasked with patrolling the Basilan Straits. In late 1914, she transferred to the Middle East and was in Port Said by the beginning of January 1915. At the end of that month she moved into the Suez Canal and was active in the defence of the canal against Turkish troops. She fired on Turkish positions on 27 January and 1–3 February, receiving incoming rifle fire on the last. She was also hit by two heavier shells, but suffered no casualties. She formed part of the British expeditionary force in the Shatt-al-Arab in April 1915, and in 1917 served in operations off Aden in March. At Dhubab on 6 May, and again at Ibn Abbas near the island of Kamaran on 8 May, landings were carried out at to punish smuggling.

In December 1919, after commissioning at Gibraltar, she took part in the fifth campaign against Mohammed Abdullah Hassan ("the Mad Mullah"). Sailors were landed, but by late February the campaign was complete. She was sold at Bombay on 12 November 1920 on the same day as Odin.

=== HMS Cadmus ===
Cadmus was first commissioned for the Australia Station. Her maiden voyage to Australia was accomplished in record time for a sloop. In May 1905, she was ordered to follow Clio to the China Station. During the rest of her career, Cadmus served there. She recommissioned at Hong Kong on 18 October 1912, and remained on the China Station during World War I. In 1920, she was listed as "unallocated" at Hong Kong, and was sold there on 1 September 1921.
