= Whitlam Square =

Intersection in Sydney, Australia

Whitlam Square, Sydney
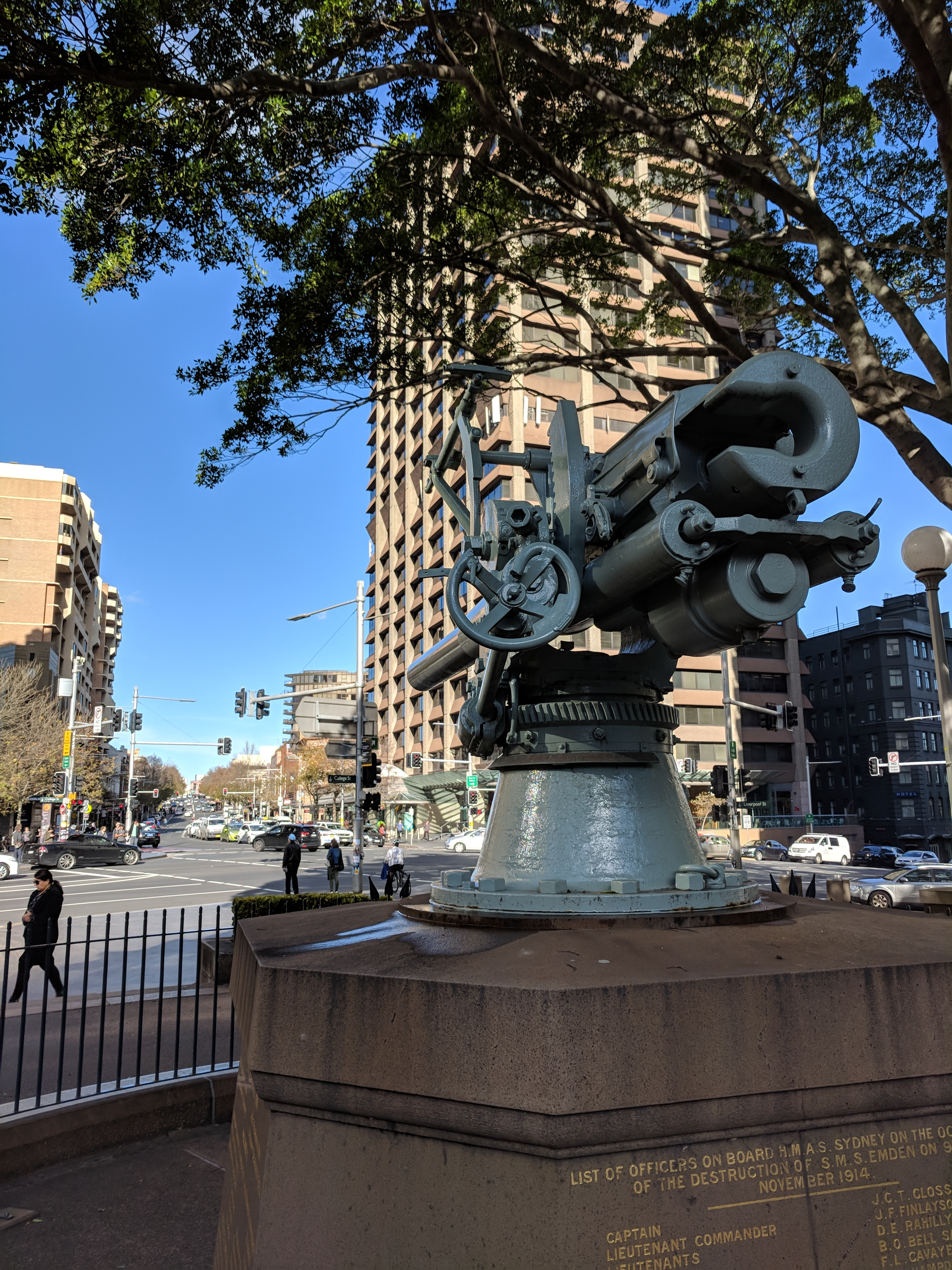
- HMAS Sydney I - SMS Emden Memorial (foreground) located in Hyde Park and Whitlam Square looking southeast along Oxford Street (background)

- Location within Sydney
- Namesake: Gough Whitlam
- Type: Road junction
- Owner: City of Sydney
- Coordinates: 33.87679°S 151.21213°E
- North: College Street
- East: Oxford Street
- South: Wentworth Avenue
- West: Liverpool Street

Construction
- Inauguration: 1983

Whitlam Square, a road junction located in Sydney, New South Wales, Australia, constitutes an important intersection of major streets in the south-eastern portion of the central business district. The square is named in honour of former Prime Minister Gough Whitlam.

Streets intersecting at Whitlam Square are College Street, Oxford Street, Wentworth Avenue and Liverpool Street. The south-east corner of Hyde Park is located at the square, with the HMAS Sydney I – SMS Emden Memorial, consisting of a 105-millimetre (4.1 in) gun from the German light cruiser SMS Emden, facing into the square.

Holdsworthy Gallery is identified at times as being at the Whitlam Square end of Liverpool Street.

The Sydney YMCA also identified as located at the square.

== Popular culture ==
Whitlam Square is also the title of a song in the album Every Brilliant Eye released in 1990 by the Australian band Died Pretty.
