= East Sydney (locality) =

Human settlement in New South Wales, Australia

Coordinates: 33°52′31″S 151°12′53″E

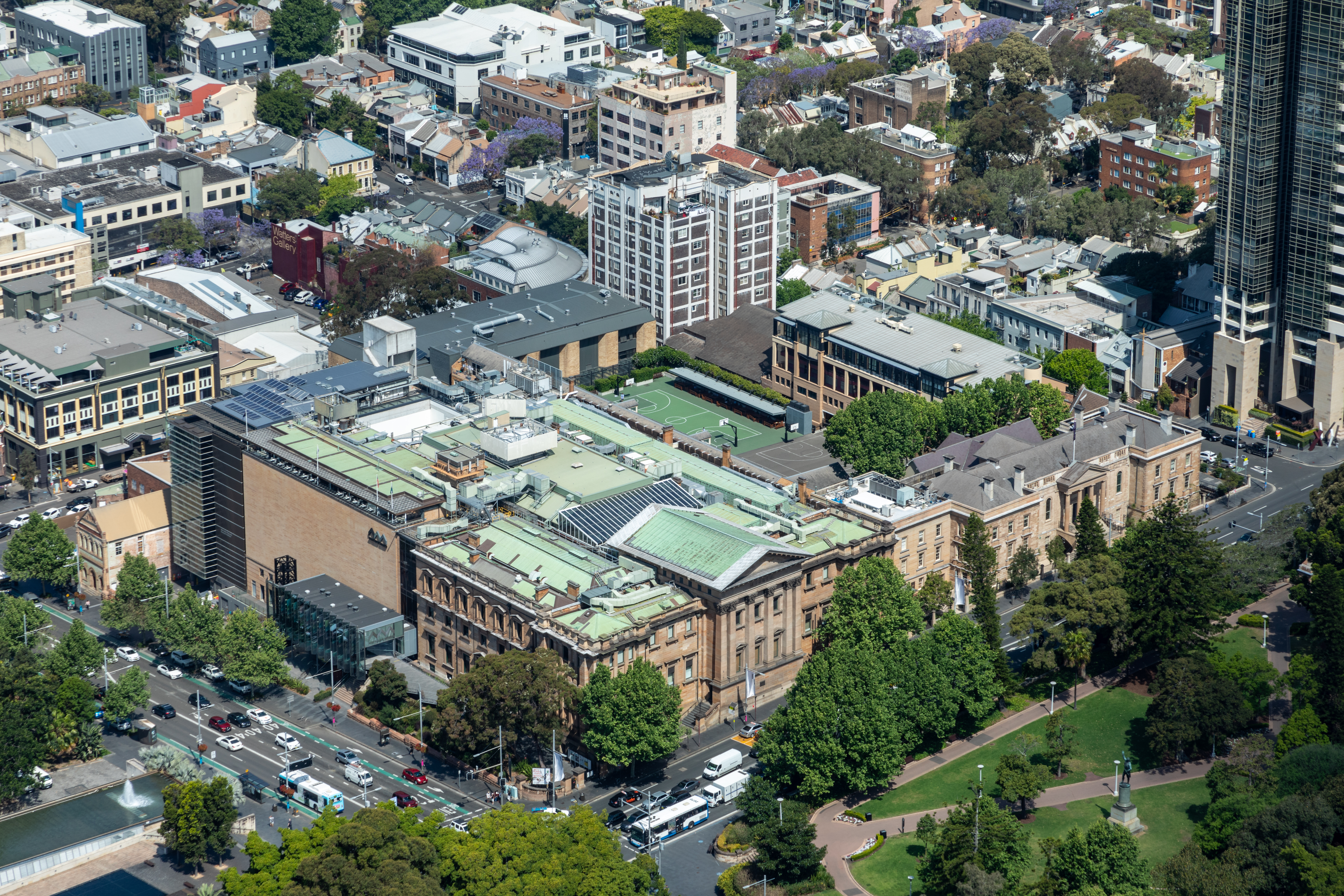
The Australian Museum in East Sydney

East Sydney is a small inner-city locality in Sydney, Australia. It is situated immediately east of the Sydney central business district, adjacent to Hyde Park.

East Sydney is a locality within the suburbs of Woolloomooloo and Darlinghurst and is in the City of Sydney. It is bounded by William, College and Oxford streets. The locality is of predominantly residential and also includes education, media, commercial, and significant cafes and restaurants. It contains a number of institutions of significance including the Australian Museum, Sydney Grammar School and a residence of the St Vincent de Paul Society.

The locality has a distinctive history, transitioning through periods of high regard to ill-repute. The locality is contained within the Office of Environment & Heritage's East Sydney and Darlinghurst Conservation Area. As of 2015, it continues to evolve as one of the last inner-city locations within Sydney to be gentrified.
