= Sydney Central Police Station =

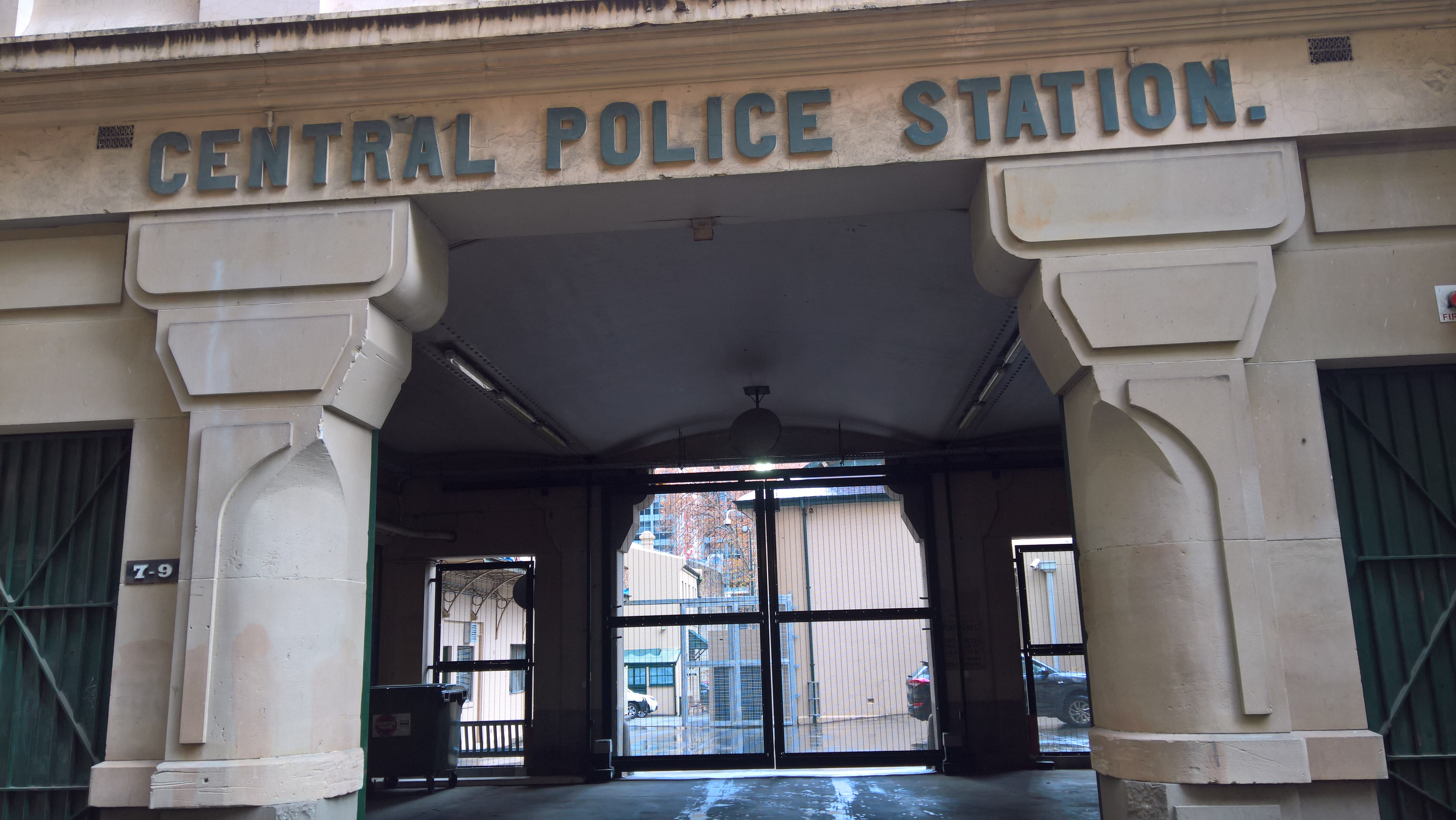
- The entrance to Sydney Central Police Station, 7-9 Central Street, Sydney

- Location within Sydney
- 33.8755°S 151.2062°E
- Location: 7-9 Central Street, Sydney central business district, City of Sydney, New South Wales, Australia

History
- Built: 1892–1955

Site notes
- Architect(s): James Barnet; NSW Government Architect

Sydney Central Police Station, 7–9 Central Street, Sydney, New South Wales, Australia, is a police station with attached holding cells that operated in association with the Central Local Court House, Sydney, for nearly 100 years.

== Description ==
The police station is located at the rear of the Court House, with access from Central Street. The rendered brick building features an 'L' shape plan with wrought iron balconies in the inner angle. The roofline rakes back from the external walls on a single pitch with galvanised gutters and downpipes. The internal facades of the building are plain rendered brick but the facade to Central Street is broken into three bays with the centre bay recessed, featuring pilasters and entablatures in a simplified classical style.

The prisoner entry from the rear street is defined by a pair of stone columns supporting an entablature with the words "Central Police Station" raised on the surface. Heavy cast iron gates close off the vehicular entry and a heavily bracketed door is located to each side of the gates. Access to the cells, located at the rear of the courthouse, is via a doorway to the right of the entrance, whilst access to the Police Station building is from the left.

The building was designed by James Barnet Colonial Architect for the Colony of New South Wales and was completed in 1892. It is constructed in the Federation Free Classical style with dressed sandstone details to the base of the ground floor façades. The original three storeys of the northern wing are clear when looking at the Central Street façade and delineated by a heavy, profiled cornice which extends across the façade. The later additions, comprising four storey amenities added to the western façade and two storeys over are evident, particularly when looking at the simpler detailing and openings.

The building comprises two wings, with the main, northern wing addressing Central Street and the southern, wing which extends from its south eastern corner. The northern wing features low pitch gable and flat roof sections. The southern wing features a skillion roof form.

The police station, which was sometimes referred to as 'Liverpool Street,' provided accommodation for about fifty police (single men) in a barracks, and included 'very complete and commodious' cells.

== History ==
Third and fourth floors were added to the northern and southern wings of the building and the original dormitories and barracks were converted into individual bedrooms and cubicles during 1926 to 1928.

By 1930, the barracks was no longer used for accommodation and had been converted to offices for the Criminal Investigation, Fingerprint and Photographic Branches, which were relocated from Police Headquarters.

Between 1935 and 1955, the external yards were enclosed for additional holding cells.

The police station closed in 1990. In 2009, the ground floor cells were being used by the adjacent Central Local Court as holding cells and the ground floor of the southern wing was used as the Police Prosecutors' Offices. The rest of the building was vacant at the time.
