= College Street, Sydney =

Street in Sydney, Australia

College Street, Sydney New South Wales
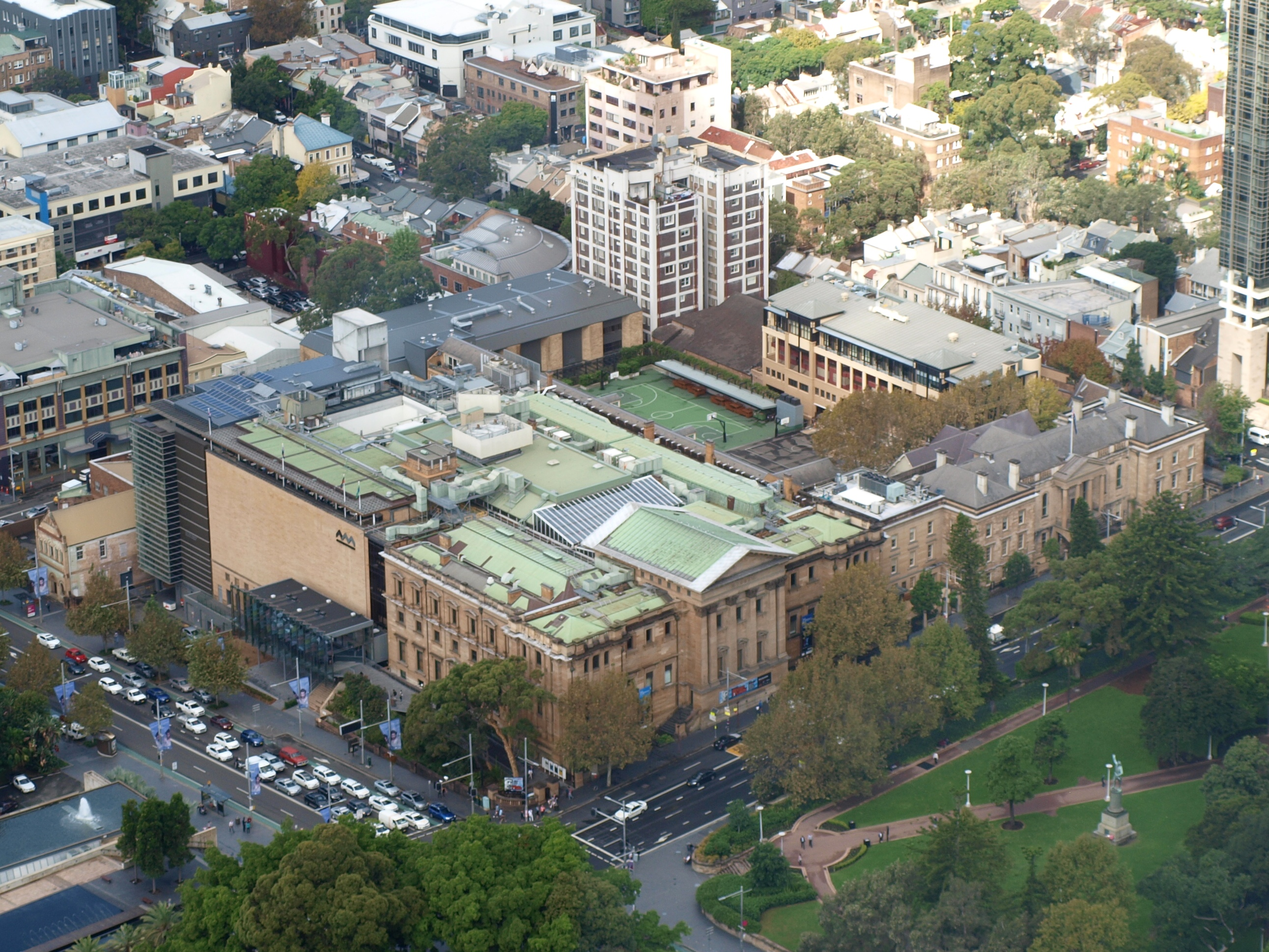
- An aerial photo of the Australian Museum with College Street running from mid-right to bottom left
- Sydney central business district
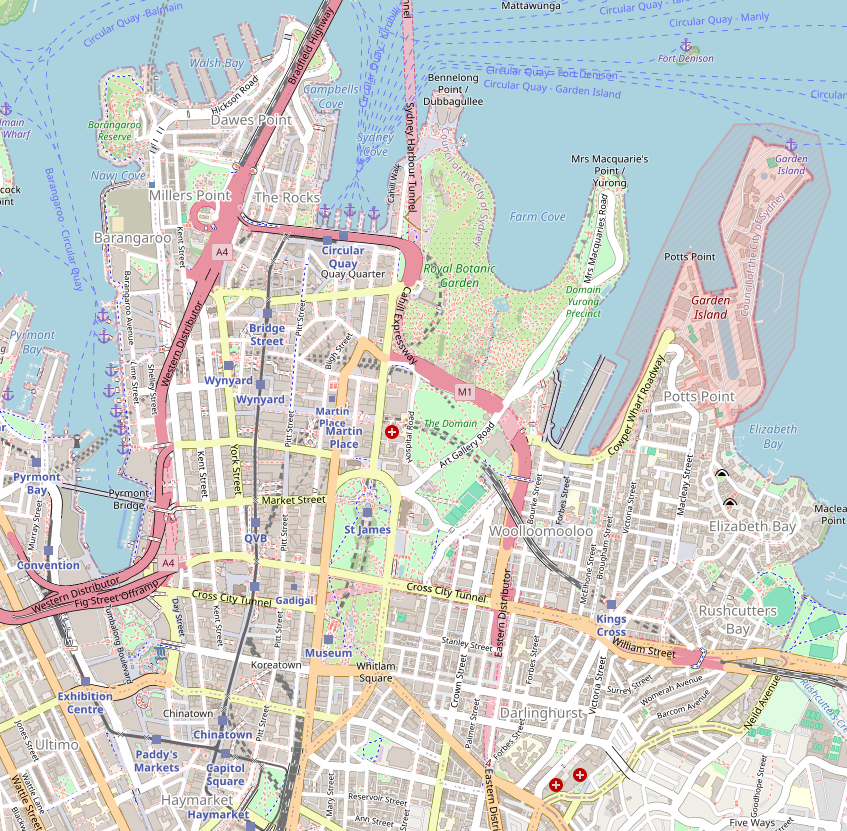
- Coordinates: 33°52′14″S 151°12′47″E (North end); 33°52′37″S 151°12′44″E (South end)

General information
- Type: Street
- Length: 700 m (0.4 mi)

Major junctions
- North end: Prince Albert Road; Sydney CBD
- Park Street; William Street
- South end: Liverpool Street; Oxford Street; Sydney CBD

Location(s)
- LGA(s): City of Sydney
- Suburb(s): Sydney CBD

Highway system
- Highways in Australia; National Highway • Freeways in Australia; Highways in New South Wales

College Street is a 700-metre (2,300 ft) major street in the central business district of Sydney in New South Wales, Australia. From north to south, it runs from east of Queens Square and St James station to start at the junction of the Prince Albert, St Mary's, and Art Gallery roads and runs to Whitlam Square, at Liverpool Street. The street gets its name from the former Sydney College, which after closure eventually became the site for the modern Sydney Grammar School. The street runs beside the eastern border of Hyde Park, and is lined by the Australian Museum, Sydney Grammar School, Cook and Phillip Park Aquatic and Fitness Centre, St Mary's Cathedral, and Australian International College.

An electric tramway formerly ran down College St. It was closed in 1960.
