= Liverpool Street, Sydney =

Street in Sydney, Australia

Liverpool Street, Sydney New South Wales
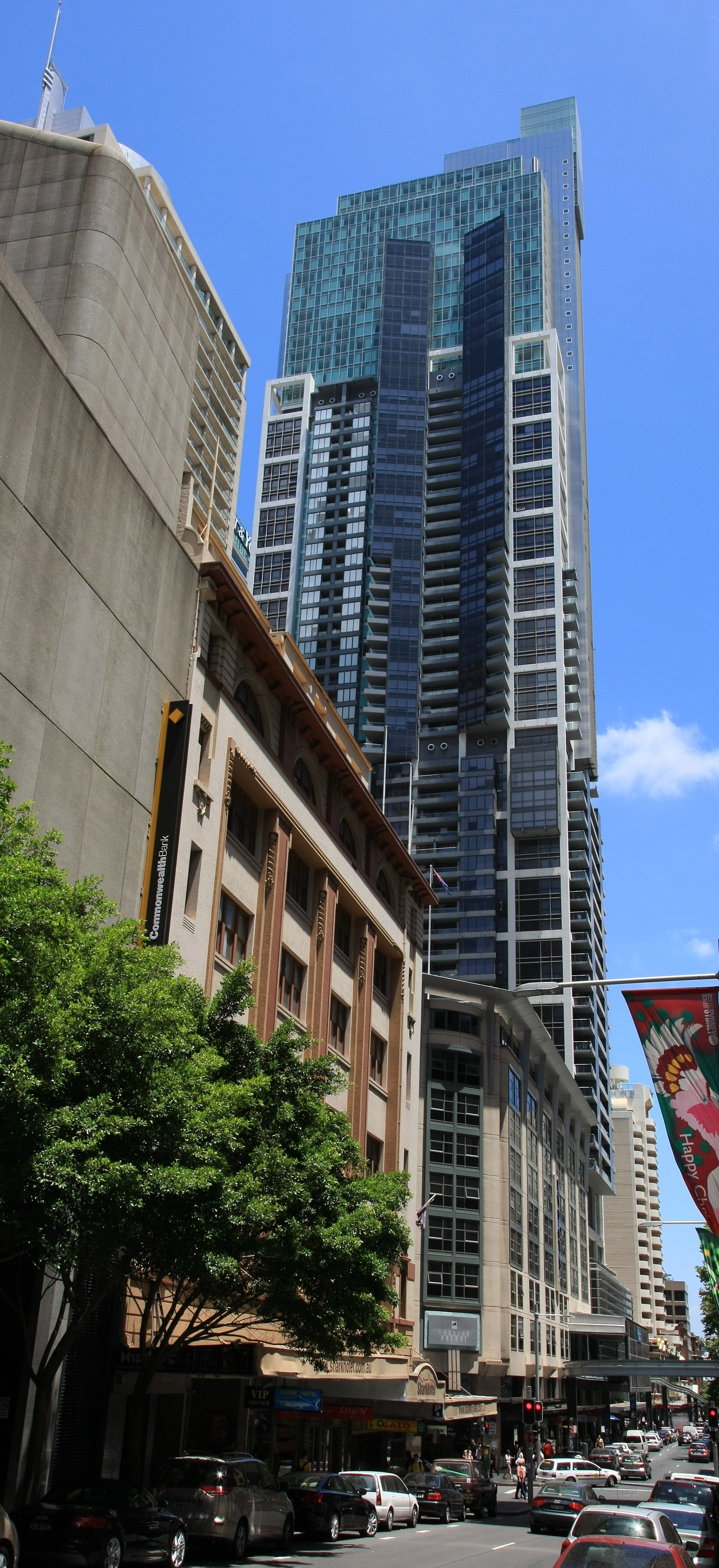
- World Tower, Liverpool Street
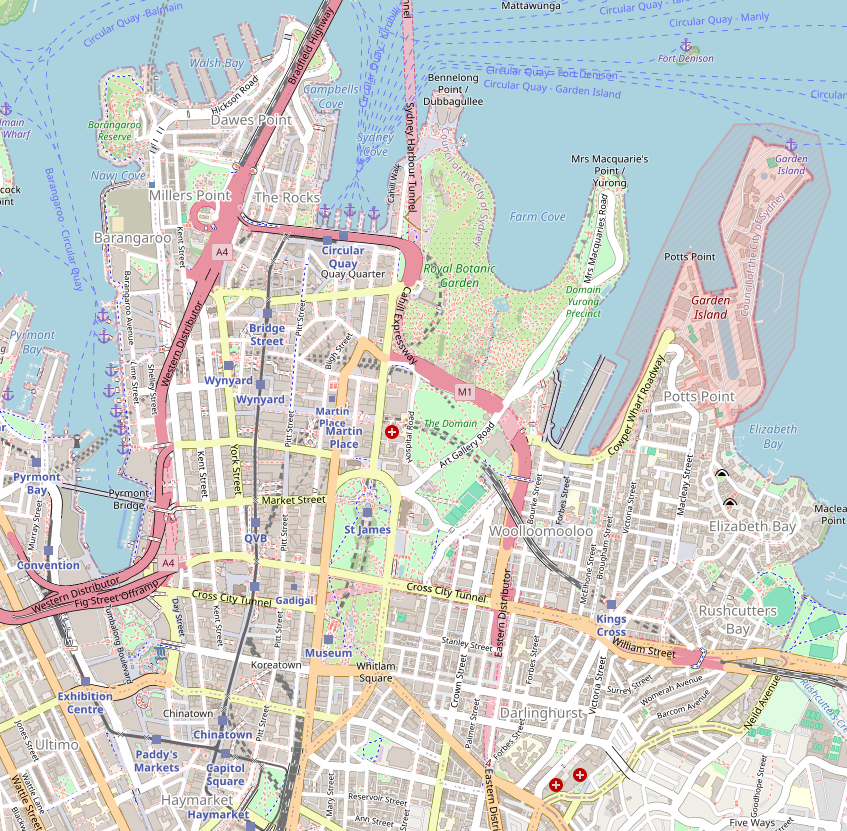
- Coordinates: 33°52′33″S 151°12′13″E (Western end); 33°52′46″S 151°13′25″E (Eastern end)

General information
- Type: Street
- Length: 1.9 km (1.2 mi)

Major junctions
- Western end: Harbour Street; Sydney CBD
- Sussex Street; Kent Street; George Street; Pitt Street; Castlereagh Street; Elizabeth Street; Oxford Street; Crown Street; Bourke Street; Darlinghurst Road; Victoria Street
- Eastern end: Boundary Street; Darlinghurst

Location(s)
- LGA(s): City of Sydney
- Major suburbs: Sydney CBD, Darlinghurst

Liverpool Street is a street in the Sydney central business district in New South Wales, Australia.

Liverpool Street runs east–west in the southern portion of the central business district and forms the southern boundary of Hyde Park. At Elizabeth Street traffic flows in a westerly direction only towards its western terminus at Darling Harbour. From Elizabeth Street in an easterly direction, traffic flows both east and west where it reaches a major intersection at Whitlam Square before continuing as a minor suburban street through East Sydney and Darlinghurst, terminating at Boundary Street.

== Developments ==
The Downing Centre (that formerly housed department store Mark Foy's Piazza Store) is a major court house complex on Liverpool Street, between Elizabeth Street and Castlereagh Street.

World Square is a large commercial and residential development which takes up a whole block, bounded by Liverpool Street, George Street, Goulburn Street and Pitt Street. It features a shopping centre, hotel, office buildings and apartment towers. Liverpool Lane, off Liverpool Street, is part of World Square and features restaurants, cafés and take away shops.

Amongst the dining options available along Liverpool Street, there is an abundance of Spanish restaurants. The area has therefore gained recognition as Sydney's "Spanish Quarter".

== Transport ==
The main entrance to Museum railway station is located on the corner of Liverpool street and Elizabeth Street. Other entrances and subways in Liverpool Street near the Downing Centre, provide links to the station.

== Gallery ==
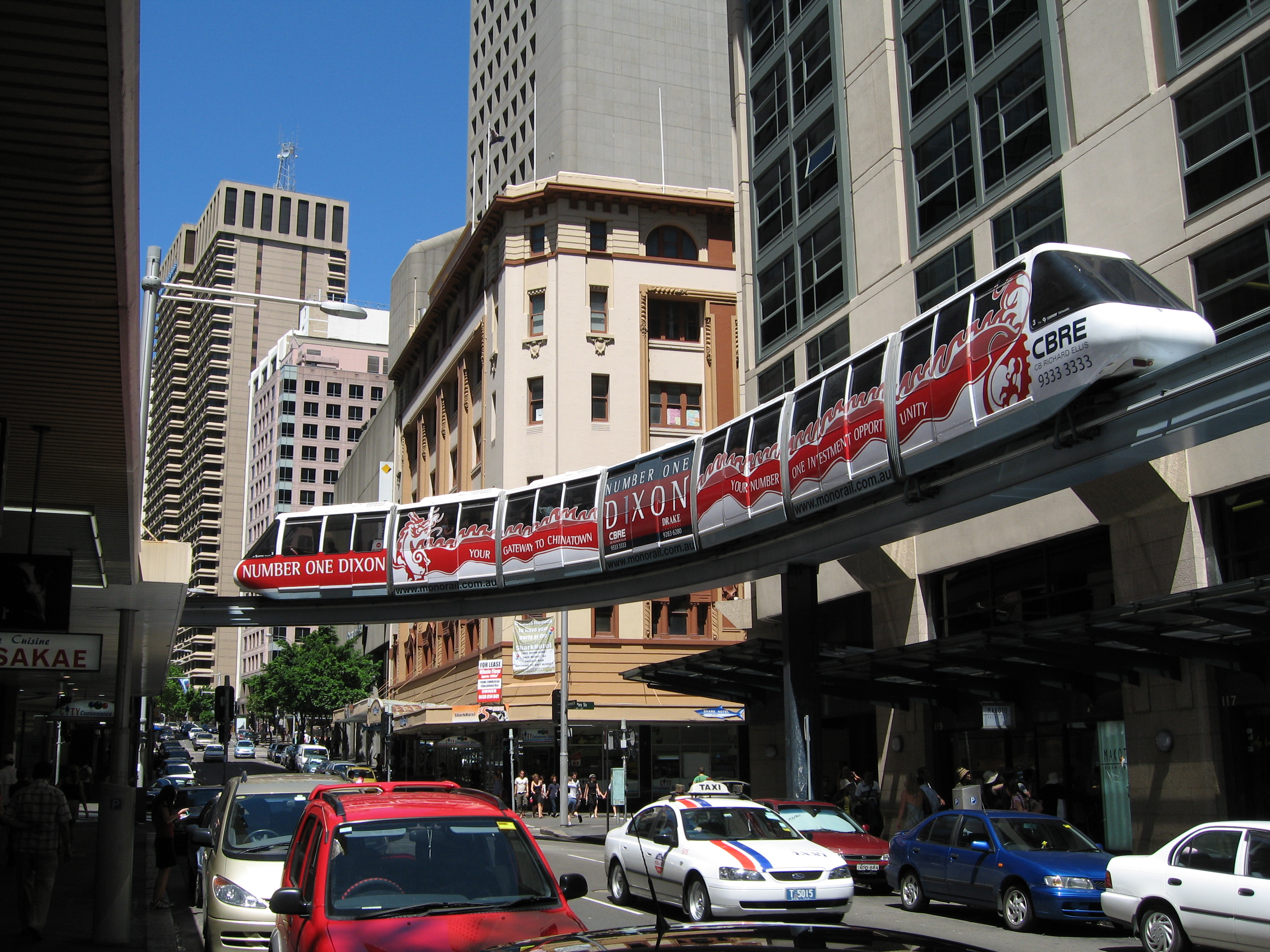
Sydney Monorail above Liverpool Street before it was removed

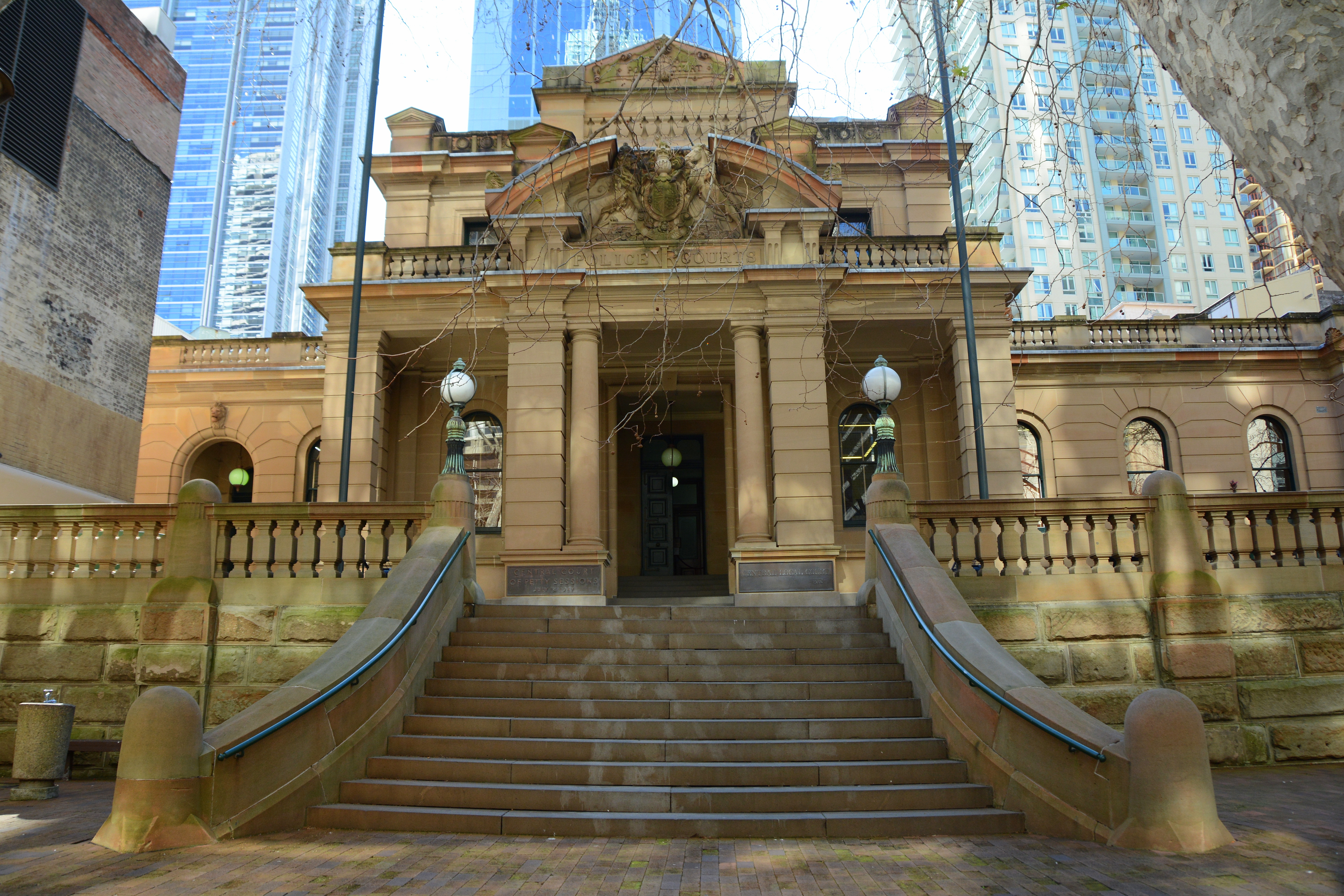
Central Court

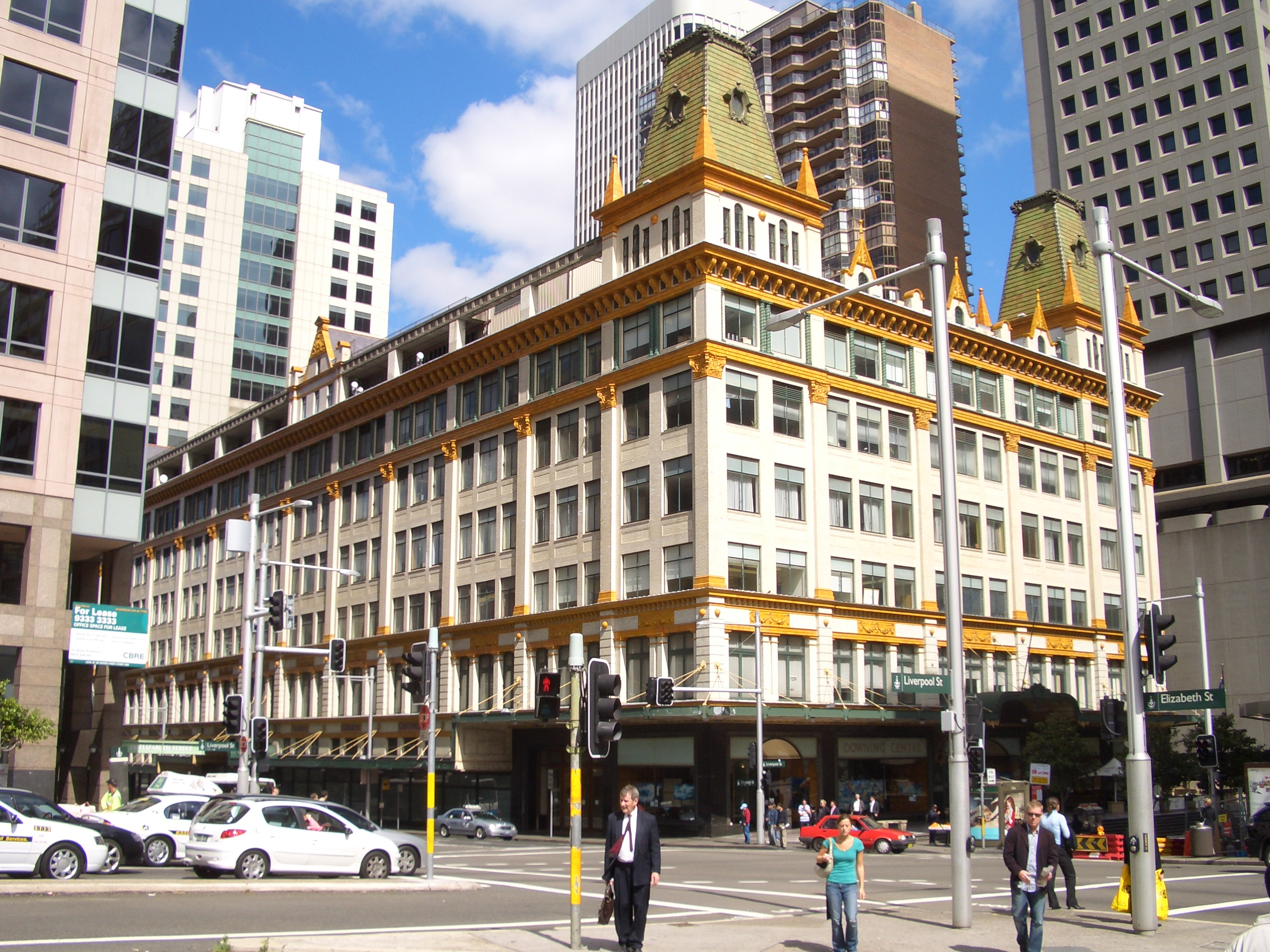
The Downing Centre, formerly Mark Foy's Piazza store

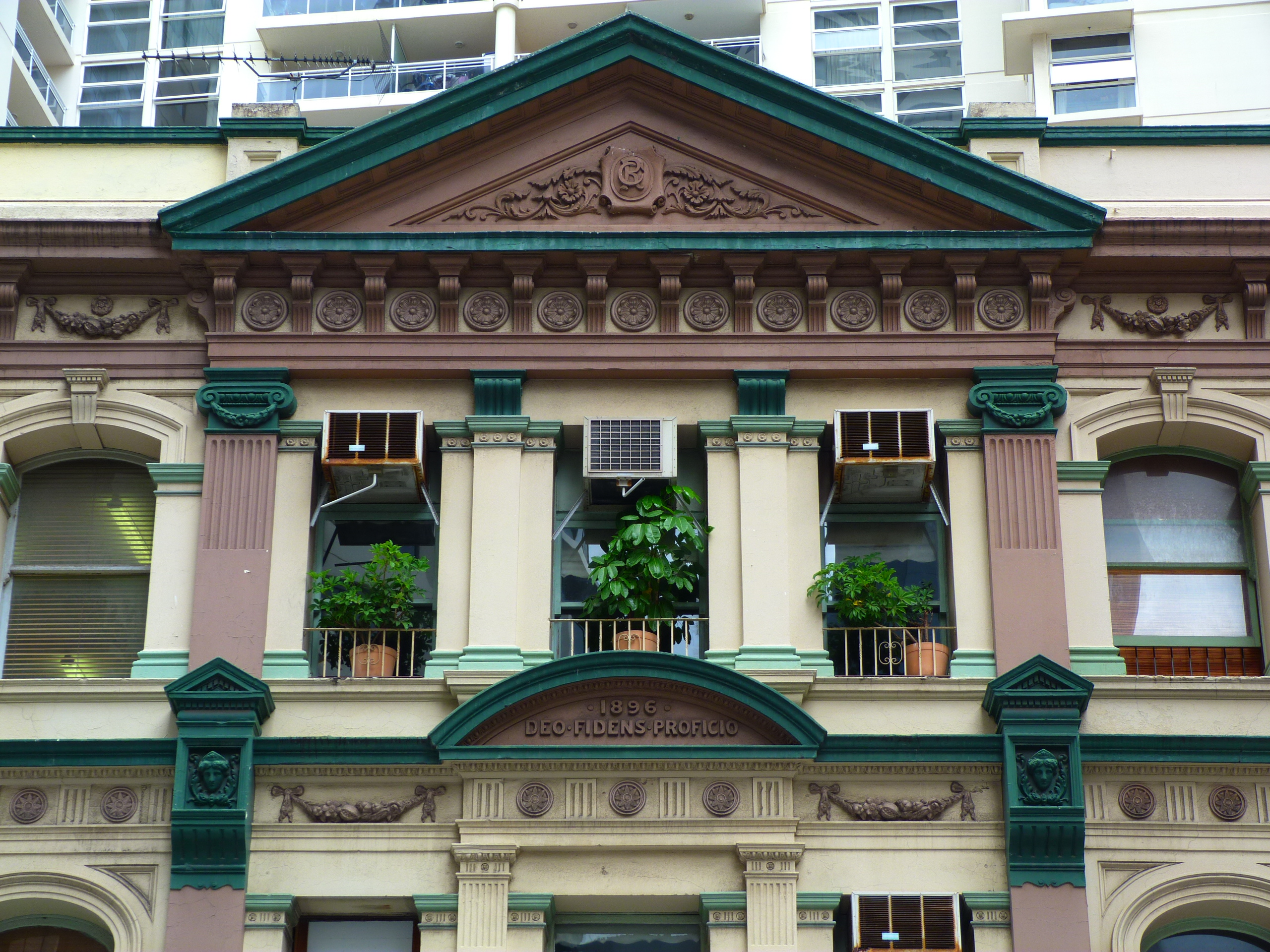
Commercial building in Victorian style

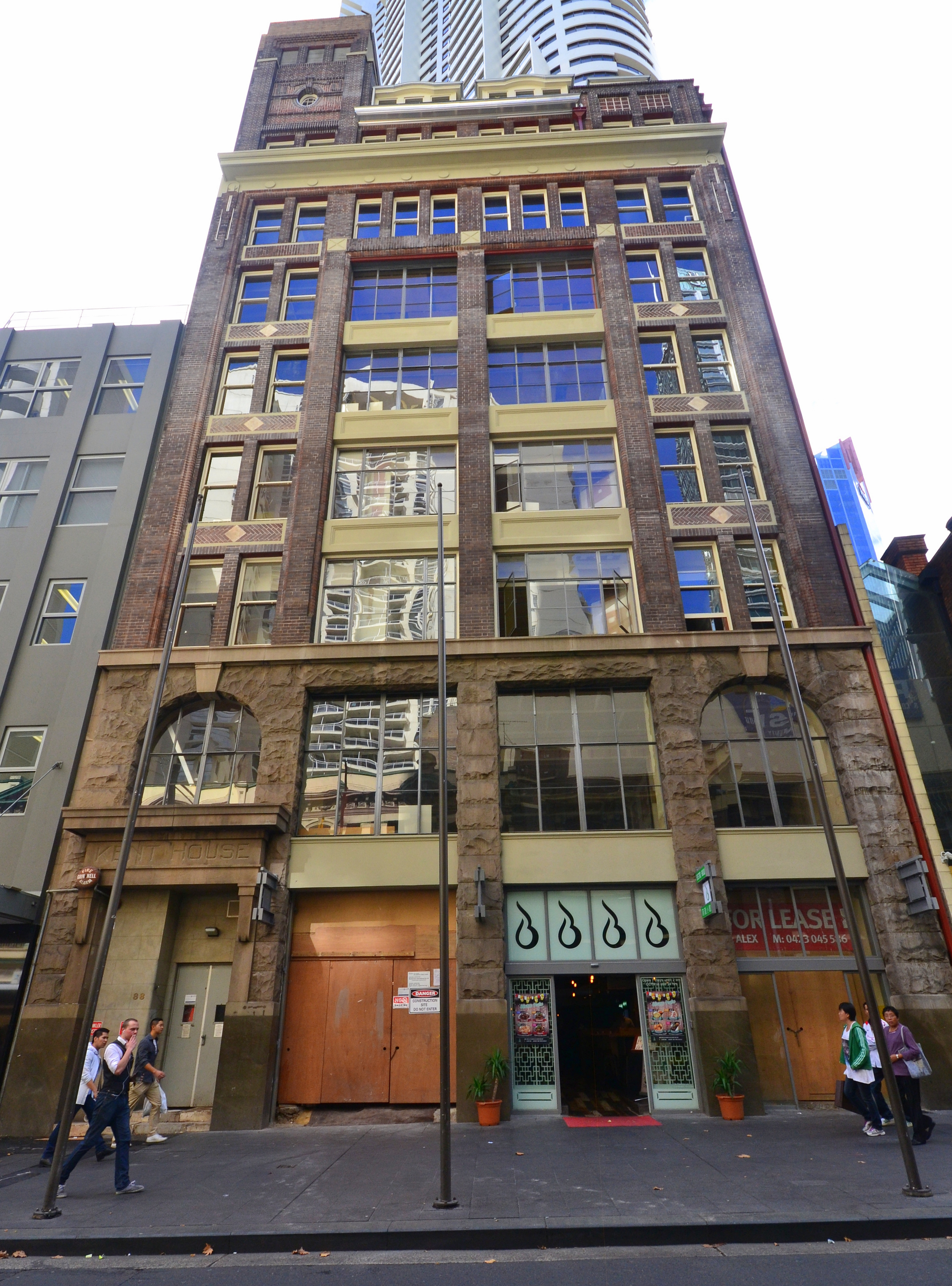
Kent House

== See also ==
- Lanes and alleyways of Sydney
