= Condor-class sloop =

- Shearwater under sail (top); Rinaldo c. 1908 with sailing rig removed (bottom)

Class overview
- Name: Condor-class sloops
- Builders: Sheerness Dockyard; Laird Brothers, Birkenhead
- Operators: Royal Navy
- Built: 1898–1900
- In commission: 1898–1932
- Completed: 6
- Lost: 1
- Retired: 5

General characteristics
- Type: Screw steel sloop
- Displacement: 980 tons
- Length: 204 ft (62 m) oa; 180 ft (55 m) pp
- Beam: 32 ft 6 in (9.91 m) (Note: The last four ships of the class were 33 ft (10 m) in beam)
- Draught: 11 ft 6 in (3.51 m)
- Installed power: 1,400 hp (1,044 kW)
- Propulsion: 4 × Belleville boilers; Three-cylinder vertical triple expansion steam engine; Twin screws
- Sail plan: Barque-rigged, changed to barquentine-rigged, later removed
- Speed: 13 kn (24 km/h) under power
- Endurance: 3,000 nmi (5,600 km) at 10 kn (19 km/h)
- Complement: 120-130
- Armament: 6 × QF 4-inch (101.6 mm) 25-pounder guns; 4 × QF 3-pounder (47-mm) guns
- Armour: Protective deck of 1 in (2.5 cm) to 1 1/2 in (3.8 cm) steel over machinery and boilers.

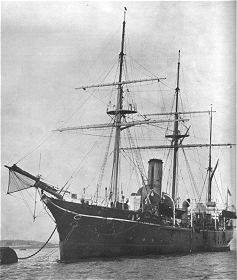
Mutine as built with barque-rig

The Condor class was a six-ship class of 10-gun screw steel sloops built for the Royal Navy between 1898 and 1900. Condor foundered in a gale, prompting the Royal Navy to abandon sailing rigs for its ships; all the others in the class survived into the 1920s. The last of the class, Mutine, survived until 1932 as a Royal Naval Volunteer Reserve drill ship.

== Design ==
The Condor class was constructed of steel to a design by William White, the Royal Navy Director of Naval Construction. They were powered by a three-cylinder vertical triple expansion steam engine developing 1,400 horsepower (1,000 kW) and driving twin screws.

=== Sail plan ===
The class was originally designed and built with barque-rigged sails, although some pictures show ships of the class with a barquentine rig. Condor was lost in a gale during her first commission, and the contemporary gunnery pioneer Admiral Percy Scott ascribes her sinking to the encumbrance of sails, and furthermore believed that her loss finally convinced the Admiralty to abandon sails entirely. All other ships of the class had their sails removed during the first few years of the twentieth century.

=== Armament ===
The class was armed with six 4-inch/25-pounder (1 ton) quick-firing breech loaders and four 3-pounder quick-firing breech loaders.

== Operational lives ==
The design of the Condor class differed from the screw sloops of the 1860s only in an evolutionary sense (although constructed of steel and armed with quick-loading guns, they retained the sails and layout of the earlier vessels); by the turn of the twentieth-century, they were thoroughly obsolete. The overseas stations of the Royal Navy were responsible for patrolling the maritime British Empire, and these ships were intended for that role. The rapidity with which they were converted to depot ships, training ships or survey ships gives testament to their outmoded design. According to Hansard, it was stated by the Secretary to the Admiralty about the almost identical Cadmus class in Parliament on 6 March 1905 that

they were never designed for fighting purposes but for subsidiary work in peace or war, for which they are still available, and in which they are at the present moment engaged.

— Ernest George Pretyman

=== HMS Condor ===
During her short career, Condor served on the Pacific Station. On 3 December 1901 while on passage from Esquimalt to Hawaii she foundered in a gale off Vancouver Island (position approximately 48°15′N 125°40′W). Her last contact was with the light station on Cape Flattery. All hands (130 ship's company and 10 supernumeries) were lost. The tragedy occurred during her first commission and less than three years after her launch. In May 1949 the trawler Blanco hauled up wreckage from a depth of 250 ft (76 m) The wreckage included a ship's binnacle matching that supplied to Condor.

=== HMS Rosario ===
Rosario relieved HMS Rattler on the China Station in June 1900, and re-commissioned at Hong Kong on 5 November 1913, becoming a depot ship for submarines. In her role as a submarine depot ship she supported a flotilla of three C-class submarines, C36, C37 and C38. These three submarines were built by Vickers, Barrow, commissioned on 1 February 1910 and sailed with HMS Rosario to Hong Kong in February 1911. They were all sold in Hong Kong on 25 June 1919. HMS Rosario was sold for scrap in Hong Kong on 11 December 1921. HMS Titania and HMS Ambrose manned the China Station from 1920 on.

=== HMS Mutine ===
While being delivered from Birkenhead to Portsmouth an incident in Mutine's boiler rooms caused some loss of life and gave her a name as an unlucky ship before her career even began. She served on the China Station and became a survey ship, surviving until 1932 as a Royal Naval Volunteer Reserve drill ship, the last of her class to be sold.

=== HMS Rinaldo ===
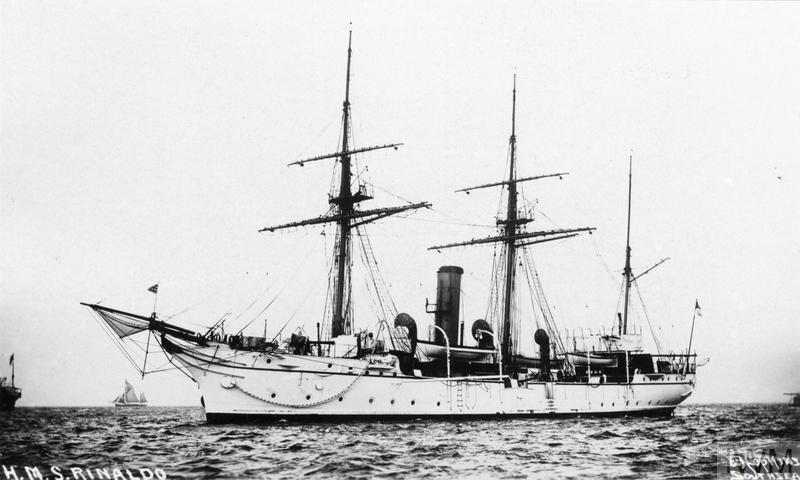
Sloop HMS Rinaldo

Rinaldo served in Southeast Asia, including taking medical assistance to Brunei in August 1904 during an outbreak of smallpox. By 1914 she was tender and training ship to HMS Vivid, Devonport Royal Naval Reserve. She then saw service in West, South and East Africa until the end of WW1. She was sold for breaking in October 1921.

=== HMS Shearwater ===
Shearwater served on the Pacific Station. She recommissioned on 27 November 1912 at Esquimalt. She was transferred to the Royal Canadian Navy as a submarine depot ship in 1915, sold to Western Shipping Co, Canada in May 1922 and renamed Vedas.

=== HMS Vestal ===
Vestal served on the China Station, later becoming training ship and tender to HMS Excellent, Portsmouth. She was sold for breaking on the same day as Rinaldo.

== Ships ==
Name	Ship Builder	Launched	Fate
Condor	Sheerness Dockyard	17 December 1898	Foundered in a gale off Cape Flattery on 3 December 1901
Rosario	Sheerness Dockyard	17 December 1898	Depot ship for submarines at Hong Kong in 1910. Sold there on 11 December 1921
Mutine	Laird Brothers, Birkenhead	1 March 1900	Survey ship 1907, RNVR drill ship 1925, sold (for ship breaking?) to Thos. W. Ward, Briton Ferry on 16 August 1932
Rinaldo	Laird Brothers, Birkenhead	25 May 1900	Sold to W Thomas, Anglesey on 21 October 1921
Shearwater	Sheerness Dockyard	10 February 1900	Transferred to Royal Canadian Navy as submarine depot ship in 1915, sold to Western Shipping Co, Canada in May 1922 and renamed Vedas
Vestal	Sheerness Dockyard	10 February 1900	Sold to W Thomas, Anglesey on 21 October 1921
