= HMS Condor (1898) =

Condor class sloop

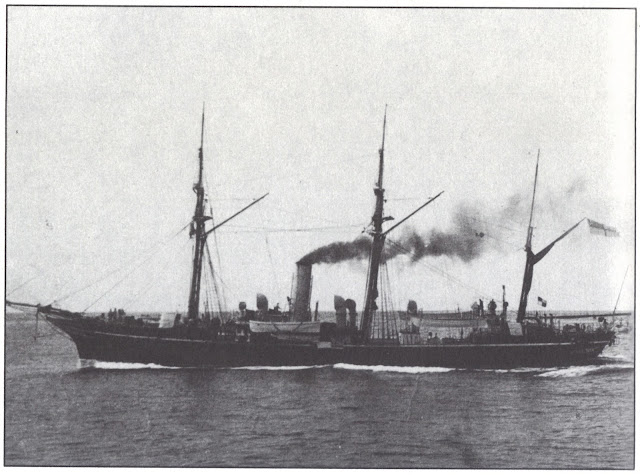
- HMS Condor in 1901

History

United Kingdom
- Name: HMS Condor
- Namesake: Condor
- Builder: Sheerness
- Launched: 17 December 1898
- Stricken: 3 December 1901
- Fate: Sunk in a gale, 1901

General characteristics (as built)
- Type: Condor-class sloop
- Displacement: 980 long tons (1,000 t)
- Length: 204 ft (62.2 m)
- Draught: 11 ft 4 in (3.5 m)
- Speed: 13.5 knots (25.0 km/h; 15.5 mph)
- Crew: 140

HMS Condor was a Condor-class sloop of the Royal Navy, and was the lead ship of her class. She was launched on 17 December 1898, and sunk in a gale on 3 December 1901.

== Design and description ==
Condor had a displacement of 980 tonnes, a length of 204 feet (62 m), a draught of 11.4 feet (3.5 m), and a speed of 13.5 knots (25.0 km/h; 15.5 mph). She had a crew size of 140 servicemen.

== Construction and career ==
Condor was laid down on 1 January 1898 in Sheerness, England. She was launched on 17 December 1898, however, the Condor would not be fully completed until 1 November 1900, being commissioned that same day. On 2 December 1901, she departed from Esquimalt, British Columbia, bound for Honolulu. On 3 December, she passed through Cape Flattery, she accidentally entered into a strong gale, and sunk. After two months, on 3 February 1902, she was listed as missing in action with all hands lost.

== Wreckage discovery ==
In May 1949, 47 years after the sinking of Condor, the fishing trawler Blanco was fishing about 40 miles (64 km) north of Cape Flattery, when her nets got tangled on a piece of the wreckage. The nets were pulled in, recovering Condor's binnacle and other miscellaneous pieces of the ship's wreckage. The rest of the wreckage was never found.
