= Battle of Zanzibar =

1914 Anglo-German naval battle during WWI

- Part of World War I
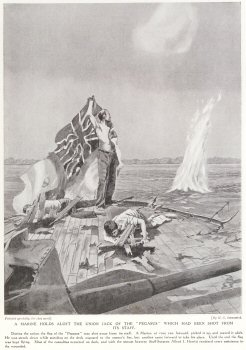
- A Royal Marine, holding up the White Ensign aboard HMS Pegasus during the battle off Zanzibar.
Date	20 September 1914
Location	Off Zanzibar, Indian Ocean 6°8′54″S 39°11′36″E
Result	German victory

Belligerents
Germany	United Kingdom

Commanders and leaders
Max Looff	John Ingles

Strength
Light cruiser Königsberg	Protected cruiser Pegasus; Tugboat Helmuth

Casualties and losses
None	39 killed 55 wounded Pegasus sunk Helmuth damaged
- Location within Tanzania Battle of Zanzibar (Africa)

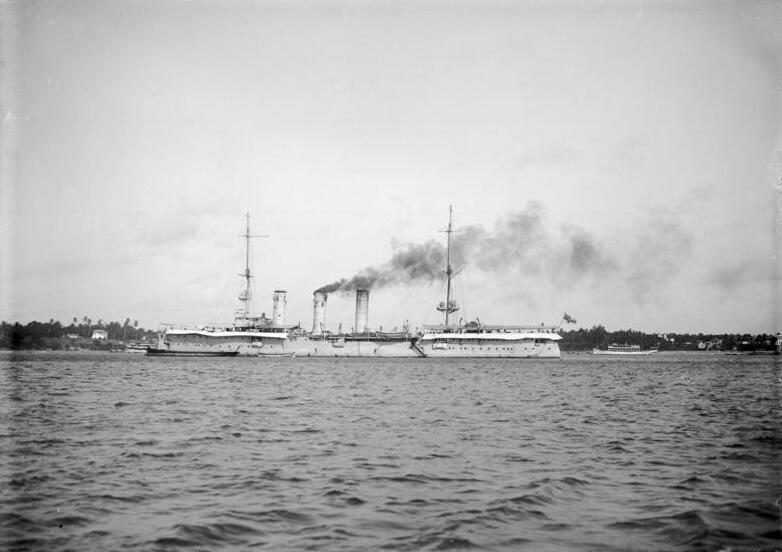
SMS Königsberg

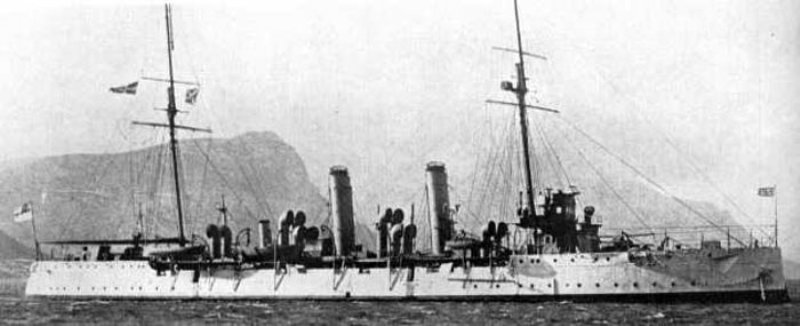
HMS Pegasus

The Battle of Zanzibar was an encounter between the German Kaiserliche Marine and the British Royal Navy early in the First World War. While taking on coal in the delta of the Rufiji River in German East Africa, the German cruiser SMS Königsberg learned that a British cruiser, HMS Pegasus, which had been part of the Royal Navy's Cape Squadron sent to counter Königsberg, had put in at Zanzibar for repairs. Königsberg's captain, Commander Max Looff, decided to attack Pegasus while she was in port.

On 20 September 1914 Königsberg sailed past the picket ship HMS Helmuth at the entrance to Zanzibar harbour. Helmuth was unable to warn Pegasus of Königsberg's approach, with the result that when Konigsberg opened fire she took Pegasus entirely by surprise. As a result, Pegasus suffered severe damage before she was even able to return fire.

Königsberg's guns out-ranged those on Pegasus, which was consequently unable to damage her opponent. The one-sided battle ended in a German victory, Pegasus sank later that day, having lost 38 crew dead.

== Background ==
Shortly after the outbreak of the First World War, on 19 September 1914, Commander Max Looff of the light cruiser SMS Königsberg was coaling in the Rufiji Delta, when he learned from coast watchers that a British warship had entered Zanzibar harbour. Looff assumed the cruiser at Zanzibar was either HMS Astraea or HMS Pegasus and ordered an immediate attack. As Königsberg had been recently resupplied, she was prepared for battle. Königsberg left on the afternoon tide for her run to Zanzibar.

The protected cruiser Pegasus, under the command of Captain John Ingles, had just left the company of HMS Astraea and Hyacinth for repairs at Zanzibar to her boilers and engines. Also at Zanzibar, the British had armed the captured German tug HMS Helmuth with a 3-pounder gun and posted her as a picket ship at the entrance of the harbor.

Königsberg had been built in 1905 and was armed with ten 10.5 cm quick-firing guns, ten 5.2 cm anti-torpedo-boat pieces and two 18 in (460 mm) torpedo tubes. Pegasus—a Pelorus-class protected cruiser built in 1897—was armed with eight QF 4-inch guns, eight 3-pounders and two 18-inch torpedo tubes. Her complement consisted of 234 officers and men.

== Battle ==
At dawn on 20 September, Königsberg entered the southern end of the Zanzibar approaches and sailed past the picket ship Helmuth, firing a few warning shots as she passed. Helmuth could neither stop the Königsberg from entering the harbour nor even warn Pegasus of the German cruiser's approach.

Once Königsberg came within 9,000 yd (8,200 m) of Pegasus, she began firing salvos. Pegasus sat at anchor in Zanzibar Harbour, preparing steam and at that moment, was helpless. For about 20 minutes while Königsberg fired, Pegasus remained stationary. Pegasus did raise the White Ensign and began firing, but her shells splashed into the water well short of Königsberg. The light cruiser slowly continued forward and fired until the range had closed to within 7,000 yd (6,400 m). One of the first British sailors wounded was gunnery officer Lieutenant Richard Turner, who suffered both of his legs being mangled by shrapnel. Despite his injuries, Turner rallied his men, telling them; "Keep it up, lads, we’re outclassed and done for; but damn them, and keep it up!"

The British continued their futile fight for around 20 minutes more, taking additional hits from Königsberg, the majority landing on Pegasus' deck. Her ensign was shot away during the fight. Also, because the Germans were always at least 2,000 yd (1,800 m) beyond the range of Pegasus' guns, no British rounds struck Königsberg.

Pegasus became holed near her waterline and began taking on water. All hope of defeating the Germans having gone, Ingles struck his colours and gave the order to abandon ship. Pegasus later sank.

After Königsberg had finished with Pegasus, she fired a few parting shots at Helmuth, whose crew managed to abandon ship before one of the German cruiser's salvos struck the tug. Having achieved a clear victory, Königsberg turned around and headed back for the Rufiji Delta.

== Aftermath ==
The Royal Navy's losses were Pegasus sunk and Helmuth damaged. Thirty-eight British sailors on Pegasus had died; another 55 sailors were wounded, most of whom had been top-side when hit. Staff Surgeon Alfred J. Hewitt was on the deck of Pegasus from the beginning to the end of the battle, aiding wounded sailors and marines. Captain Ingles later recognized Hewitt's courageous behaviour in a report on the action. Although Helmuth had taken a hit from Königsberg, the damage to the tug was relatively minor and her crew managed to reboard her after Königsberg had sailed off. Only one man on board Helmuth died, a non-enlisted native working in the engine room.

The hospital ship Gascon and the Scottish merchant ship SS Clan Macrae rescued the survivors of Pegasus. Twenty-four of the British sailors that died in the battle were buried in a mass grave in the naval cemetery on Grave island, Zanzibar, while 14 others were laid to rest at the town's cemetery before being moved in 1971 to the Dar es Salaam war cemetery. The British salvaged six of Pegasus' guns from the wreck and later used them in the East African land campaign.

Although Königsberg had suffered no hits or casualties, Looff's plans to continue the offensive were soon cut short. One of her main engines failed. The British were watching the port of Dar es Salaam so she had to return to the Rufiji River delta to await the overland transport of spare parts. The British soon discovered Königsberg's location and blockaded her. They damaged her beyond repair in the Battle of Rufiji Delta when they were able to bring up the monitors HMS Mersey and Severn that July.

== See also ==
- East African Campaign (World War I)
