= Pelorus =

Pelorus may refer to:

== Places ==
- Pelorus (Sicily), a peninsula of the island of Sicily
- Pelorus Island, an island in Queensland
- Pelorus Islet, an islet in South Australia
- Pelorus River, a river in the South Island of New Zealand
- Pelorus Sound / Te Hoiere, in the Marlborough Sounds of New Zealand
- Pelorus (Πέλωρος), an ancient Greek name for a river in the Caucasus region, probably the modern-day Aragvi; see Artoces of Iberia

== Ships ==
- HMS Pelorus, several Royal Navy ships
- Pelorus (yacht), a 2001 luxury yacht
- Pelorus-class cruiser, a Royal Navy cruiser class

== Other ==
- Pelorus (instrument), a navigational instrument
- Pelorus Jack, a dolphin
- Pelorus Research, a trading name of Holdingham Group Limited
- In Greek mythology, Pelorus was one of the Spartoi
