= Alfred Grant =

Alfred Grant may refer to:

- Hamilton Grant (Alfred Hamilton Grant, 1872–1937), British diplomat and politician
- Alfred Grant (politician) (1840–1883), politician who served in the state legislature in Florida
- Alfred Ernest Albert Grant (1861–1933), Royal Navy officer
