= HMS Psyche =

Five ships of the Royal Navy have been named HMS Psyche. Two more were planned, but never completed.

- HMS Psyche was a 36-gun fifth rate captured from the French in 1805 and sold in 1812.
- HMS Psyche was to have been a 32-gun fifth rate. Frames for her construction were sent to Canada, but she was not assembled, and the parts were ordered to be sold in 1814, though they may have been incorporated in the next HMS Psyche.
- HMS Psyche (1814) was to have been a 56-gun fourth rate assembled in Canada. She was completed but never entered service and the hulk was sunk in 1837.
- HMS Psyche (1862) was a wooden paddle despatch vessel launched in 1862. She was wrecked in 1870, with the wreck being destroyed in 1871.
- HMS Psyche (1878) was a coastguard vessel purchased in 1878 and sold in 1884.
- HMS Psyche was a Pearl-class protected cruiser launched in 1889 and renamed HMS Ringaromma in 1890. She was sold in 1906.
- HMS Psyche was a Pelorus-class protected cruiser launched in 1898. She was transferred to the Royal Australian Navy as HMAS Psyche in 1915 and was sold in 1922.

== Battle honours ==
Ships named HMS Psyche are entitled to a single battle honour:

- Java 1811
