= HMS Pegasus (1897) =

Pelorus-class cruiser

Coordinates: 6°8′54″S 39°11′36″E

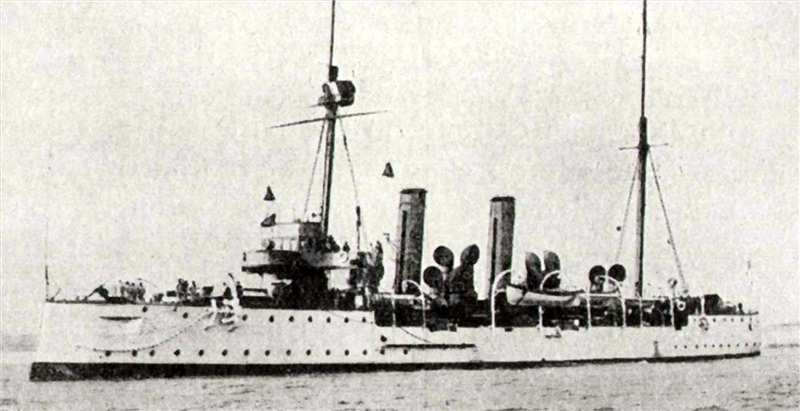
- HMS Pegasus

History

United Kingdom
- Name: HMS Pegasus
- Ordered: 1893
- Builder: Palmers Shipbuilding and Iron Company
- Yard number: 718
- Laid down: May 1896 at Jarrow
- Launched: 4 March 1897
- Commissioned: 17 January 1899
- Motto: "Excelsior"
- Fate: Sunk by SMS Königsberg in Zanzibar harbour, 20 September 1914

General characteristics
- Class & type: Pelorus-class protected cruiser
- Displacement: 2,135 long tons (2,169 t) (normal); 2,740 long tons (2,780 t) (full load)
- Length: 300 ft (91.4 m)
- Beam: 36 ft 6 in (11.13 m)
- Draught: 17 ft (5.2 m)
- Installed power: 7,000 ihp (5,220 kW)
- Propulsion: 8 × Reed water tube boilers; 2 × triple expansion steam engines; 2 × screws
- Speed: 20 kn (23 mph; 37 km/h)
- Complement: 224
- Armament: 8 × QF 4 in (102 mm) guns; 8 × QF 3-pounder guns; 2 × 18-inch (450-mm) torpedo tubes
- Armour: 0.25in (gun shields); 2-1.5in (decks)

HMS Pegasus was one of 11 Pelorus-class protected cruisers ordered for the Royal Navy in 1893 under the Spencer Program and based on the earlier Pearl class. The class were fitted with a variety of different boilers, most of which were not entirely satisfactory, and by 1914, four ships had been withdrawn. They had all been condemned in 1904 but were reprieved and remained in service, with scrapping proposed in 1915.

== History ==
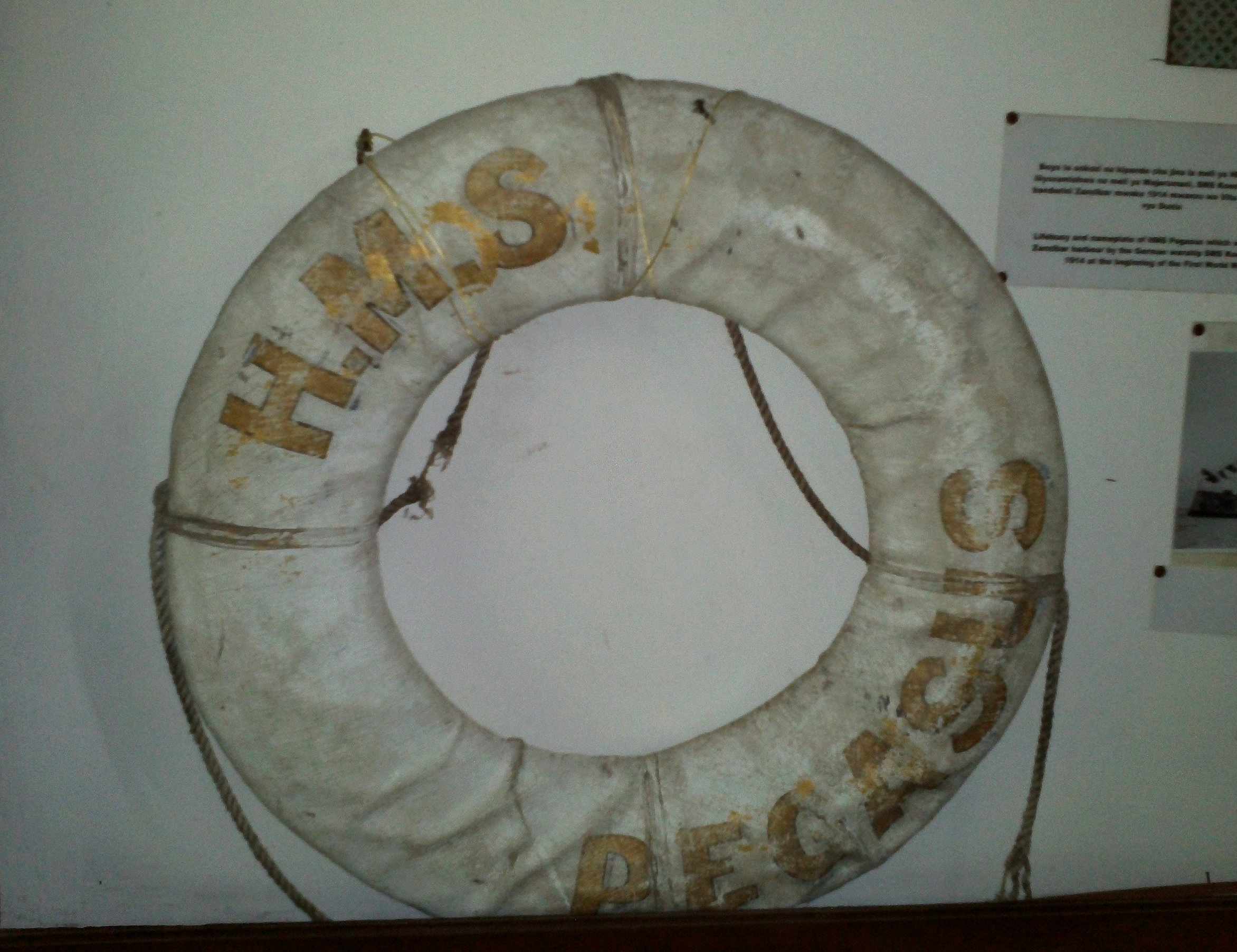
Lifebuoy from HMS Pegasus in Zanzibar Museum

Pegasus was completed in 1898, and in 1899, she was stationed off the southeast coast of America. She was commissioned at Chatham on 21 May 1901 by Commander Edmund Hyde Smith, to serve at the Mediterranean Station. In June 1902 she was in Gibraltar for a coronation fête, and in September that year she visited the Aegean Sea with other ships of the station for combined manoeuvres near Nauplia. She was later stationed at Australia, China, and finally Africa, serving on the Cape of Good Hope Station in 1906.

In 1908, Pegasus rescued the crew of the wrecked French barque President Félix Faure, who had been stranded for sixty days on the Antipodes Islands.

=== First World War ===
Pegasus remained part of the Cape Station on the eve of the outbreak of the First World War. As the likelihood of war with Germany increased, the commander of the Cape Station, Rear Admiral Herbert King-Hall, deployed his ships in order to counter the threat posed by the German light cruiser Königsberg, based at Dar es Salaam. On 31 July 1914, Pegasus sighted Königsberg leaving Dar es Salaam, but was unable to keep track of the faster German cruiser. King-Hall recognised that Königsberg outclassed Pegasus and intended that Pegasus should operate with the cruiser Astraea while his flagship Hyacinth operated independently to protect the trade routes around the Cape, but on 12 August, the Admiralty ordered Astraea to join Hyacinth off the Cape to escort troop convoys, leaving Pegasus unsupported at Zanzibar. On 23 August Pegasus sailed to the port of Bagamoyo in German East Africa with the intention of forcing a truce so that the port would take no further part in the war. (Note: Similar agreements had previously been made with the authorities of Dar es Salaam and Tanga.) When the port authorities refused to agree to such a truce, Pegasus shelled the port's Customs House.

== Sinking ==
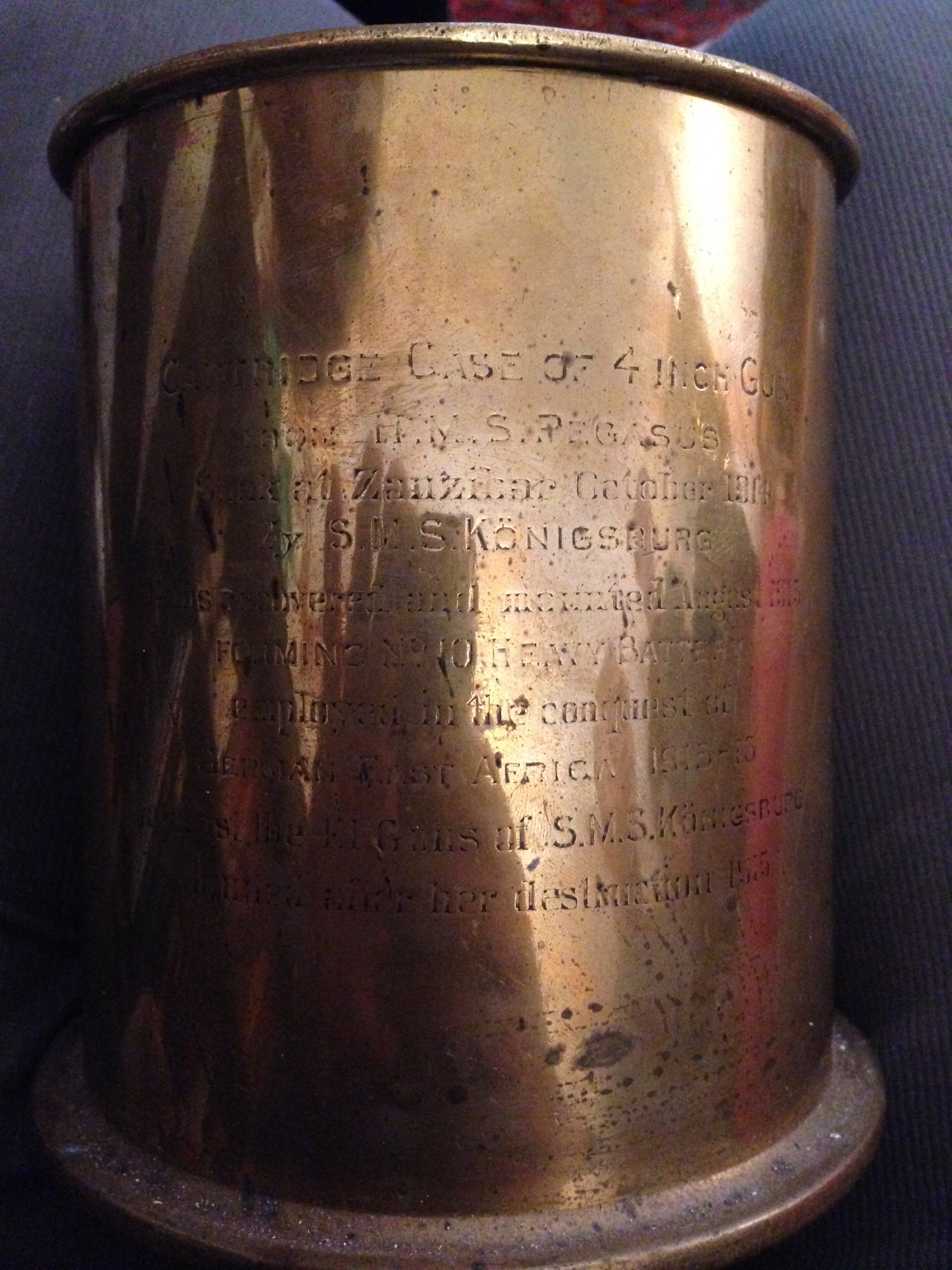
Kindling box made from a 4" cartridge cases from HMS Pegasus, inscribed with its history.

On 18 September 1914 Pegasus returned to Zanzibar harbour to carry out repairs to her engines. In the early morning of 20 September Königsberg launched a surprise attack on Pegasus. Pegasus's engines were shut down to allow the repairs, and outranged and outgunned, was incapacitated within eight minutes, and the captain – Commander Ingles – struck the colours to avoid further bloodshed. She was the last Royal Navy ship to surrender in a combat action.

The ship sank later that day, with 31 lives lost and 55 wounded. The hospital ship Gascon and Scottish ship Clan Macrae came to the aid of the survivors.

Pioneer—Pegasus' sister ship—later assisted in the blockade of the Rufiji River where Königsberg had taken refuge.

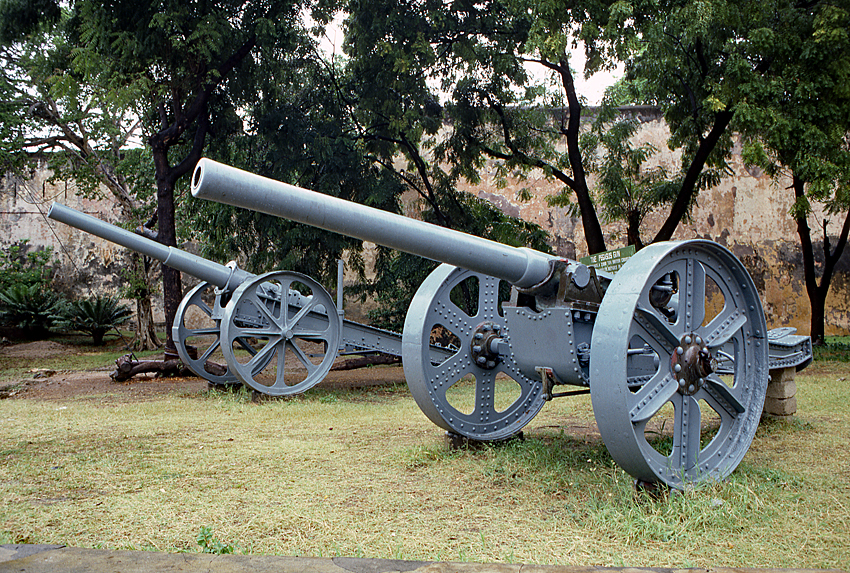
Gun from HMS Pegasus at Fort Jesus

Six of the eight guns were salvaged and two, named "Peggy III" and "Peggy IV", were used in the land campaign until 1916. These guns found themselves in action against guns salvaged from Königsberg again on land in 1915 while under the command of Major Granville Orde Browne RA. Of the other four, two remained in Zanzibar, one was mounted on board the lake steamer Winifred, and the last mounted at Mombasa where it survives to this day outside Fort Jesus museum. 24 of the British sailors who were killed in the battle were buried in a mass grave in part of the naval cemetery on Grave Island, Zanzibar. The remaining 14 were buried in the town cemetery, but in 1971 were reinterred at Dar es Salaam war cemetery. The wreck was sold in 1955 for £500 and broken up for scrap, but large amounts of debris still remain on the seabed.
