= HMAS Psyche =

Pelorus-class cruiser

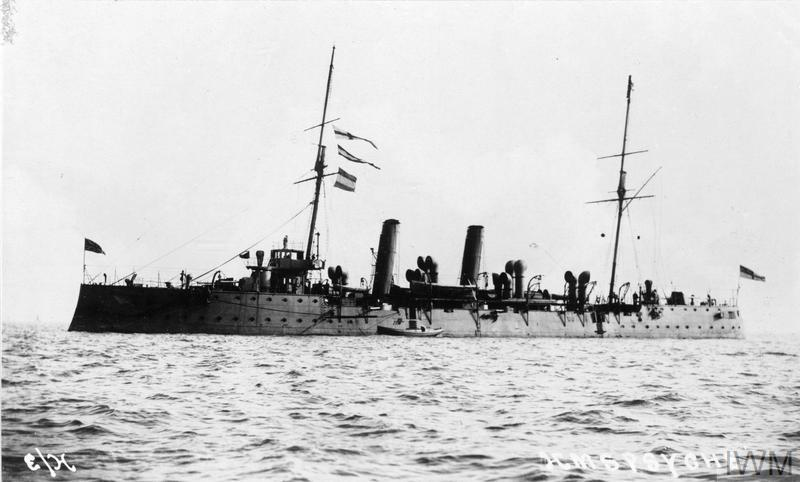
- Psyche

History

United Kingdom
- Name: HMS Psyche
- Builder: HM Devonport Dockyard
- Laid down: 15 November 1897
- Launched: 19 July 1898
- Commissioned: 2 May 1899
- Decommissioned: 22 January 1915
- Honours and awards: One inherited battle honour
- Fate: Transferred to the Royal Australian Navy 1 July 1915

History

Australia
- Name: HMAS Psyche
- Acquired: 1 July 1915
- Commissioned: 1 July 1915
- Decommissioned: 26 March 1918
- Fate: Sold 21 July 1922; Sank 1940
- Notes: Served as timber lighter 1922–1940

General characteristics
- Class & type: Pelorus-class cruiser
- Displacement: 2,135 long tons (2,169 t)
- Length: 313.5 ft (95.6 m) length overall; 300 ft (91 m) between perpendiculars
- Beam: 36.5 ft (11.1 m)
- Draught: 15 ft (4.6 m)
- Propulsion: 2 × triple expansion steam engines, 7,000 ihp (5,200 kW), two screws
- Speed: 20 kn (37 km/h; 23 mph)
- Complement: Initially 220, reduced to 188
- Armament: 8 × single QF 4-inch (102 mm) guns; 8 × single QF 3-pounder (47 mm) guns; 2 × QF 4.7-inch (120 mm) guns; 2 field guns; 3 × Maxim machine guns; 2 × 14-inch (356 mm) torpedo tubes
- Armour: Deck: 1 1/2–2 in (38–51 mm) deck; Gunshields: 1/4 in (6.4 mm); Conning tower: 3 in (76 mm)

HMAS Psyche (formerly HMS Psyche) was a Pelorus-class protected cruiser built for the Royal Navy at the end of the 19th century. Initially operating on the North America and West Indies Station, the cruiser was transferred to the Australian Squadron in 1903, and remained there until the Royal Australian Navy (RAN) took over responsibility in 1913. After a stint in New Zealand waters and involvement in the Occupation of German Samoa, Psyche was paid off in 1915.

At the recommendation of the Australian government, the ship was commissioned into the RAN in 1915, and assigned to patrol the coast of Burma, in response to the threat of a German-instigated uprising. Psyche operated in the Bay of Bengal and around Sumatra until 1916, when she was docked at Hong Kong for refit. During this, personnel from the ship were used to commission and man the river gunboat HMS Moorhen. After the refit's conclusion, Psyche patrolled in Chinese waters, before returning to the Bay of Bengal. Psyche returned to Sydney and was paid off in October 1917, but recommissioned a month later for patrols in Australia's northern waters. She was decommissioned for the final time in early 1918. The ship was sold for use as a timber lighter in 1922, and sank in 1940 at Salamander Bay, New South Wales following a storm.

== Design and construction ==
Psyche was a third-class protected cruiser of the nine-ship Pelorus- or P-class. She had a displacement of 2,135 tons, was 313 feet 6 inches (95.55 m) long overall and 300 feet (91 m) long between perpendiculars, had a beam of 36 feet 6 inches (11.13 m), and a draught of 15 feet (4.6 m). Propulsion was supplied by inverted three-cylinder triple expansion steam engines, built by Keyham, providing 7,000 indicated horsepower (5,200 kW) to two propeller shafts. Psyche was capable of reaching 20 knots (37 km/h; 23 mph), although she normally operated at the more economical speedo of 8 knots (15 km/h; 9.2 mph).

The cruiser was armed with eight single QF 4 in (100 mm) guns, eight single QF 3-pounder guns, two 4.7-inch guns, two field guns, three Maxim machine guns, and two 14 in (356 mm) torpedo tubes sited above the waterline. Armour protection was limited to 50 mm (2.0 in) thick section of deck plating over vital areas. The ship's company initially stood at 220, but this was later reduced to 188; 12 officers, and 176 sailors.

Psyche was laid down for the Royal Navy at HM Devonport Dockyard, Plymouth on 15 November 1897. She was launched on 19 July 1898 by Miss E. Carr, sister of the dockyard's admiral superintendent. The cruiser was completed on 28 April 1899, and was placed in reserve until her commissioning on 2 May 1899.

== Operational history ==
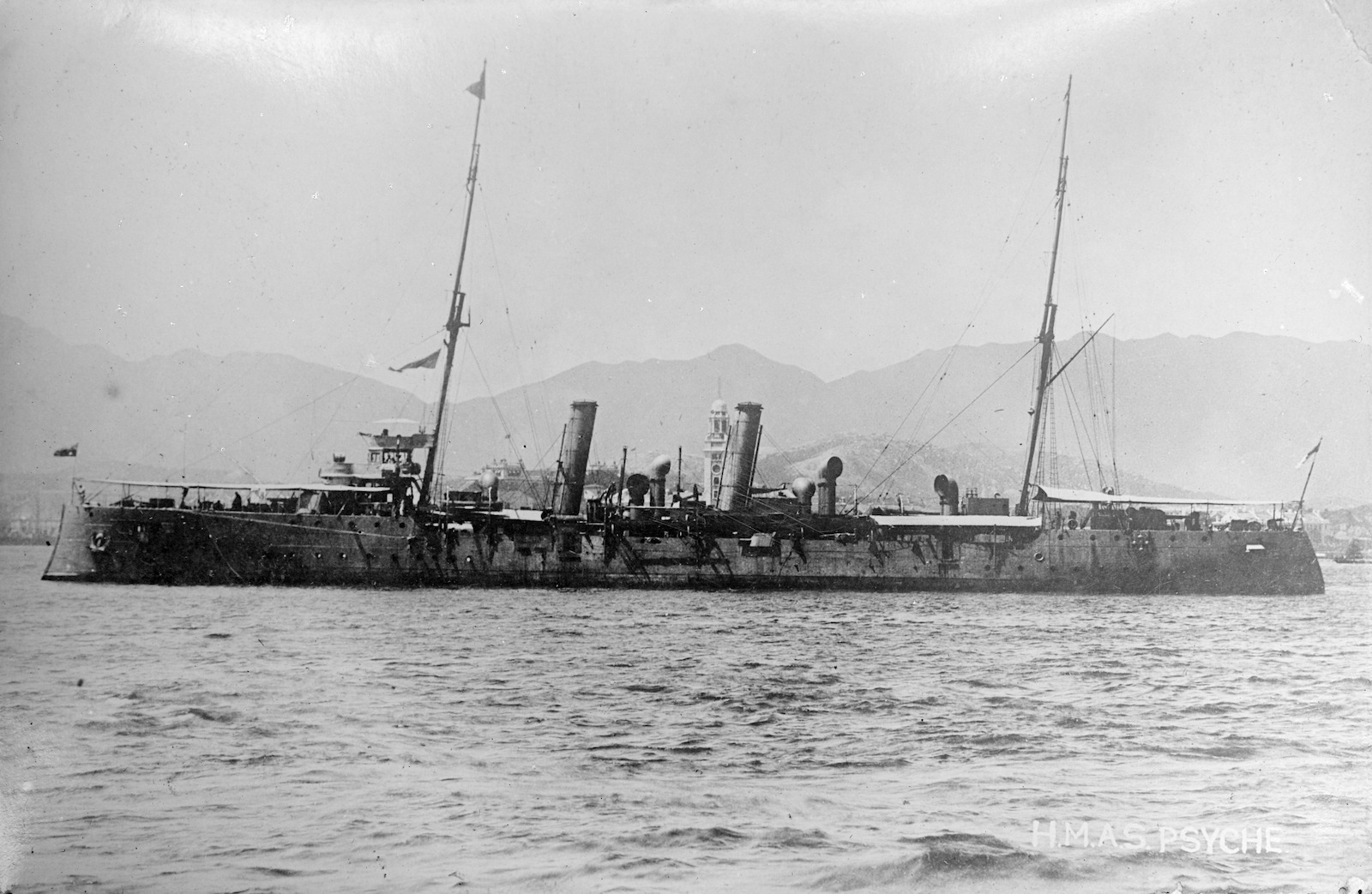
HMS Psyche

Psyche was commissioned on 2 May 1899 by Captain Francis Raymond Pelly, for service on the North America and West Indies Station, based at the Royal Naval Dockyard in the Imperial fortress colony of Bermuda. Ships of the station's squadron exercised together in Bermudian waters and were maintained at the dockyard between extensive cruises around the western North Atlantic and the West Indies, visiting various British and foreign ports to "show the flag". Commander Edmund Moore C. Cooper-Key replaced Pelly in command in June 1901. She was at Bermuda in March 1902, visited Colón, Panama in early May, and Havana in late May 1902; and was in Nicaragua in July 1902, when the government captured revolutionists from an attempted coup. The following month she left Bermuda homeward bound, returning to Devonport on 20 August, to pay off on 5 September when she was placed in the D division of the dockyard reserve.

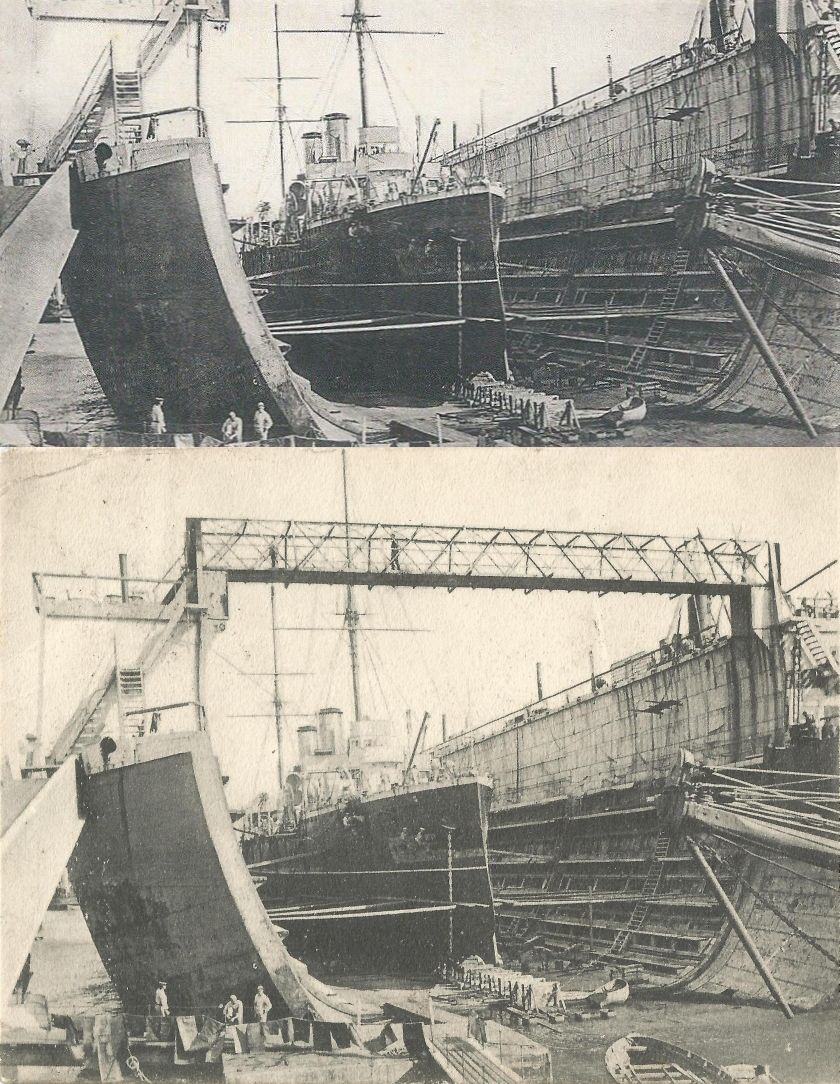
HMS Psyche in the floating drydock at HM Dockyard Bermuda, circa 1899-1902.

In December 1903, she was transferred to the Royal Navy's Australian Squadron, where she served until October 1913, when the Australia Station was handed to the control of the fledgling RAN. Psyche was then assigned to New Zealand waters. In 1914, Psyche formed part of the escort for the New Zealand Force which occupied German Samoa (now Samoa). Psyche also escorted troop ships heading from New Zealand to the Middle East. She returned to Sydney in late 1914, and was decommissioned on 22 January 1915.

Association football (soccer) team of HMS Psyche. 1910

In May 1915, the Australian government suggested to the Admiralty that Psyche be reactivated and loaned to the RAN as a training ship. Approval was granted on 1 June, but before the ship's 1 July commissioning as HMAS Psyche, the Admiralty instead requested that the Australian Commonwealth Naval Board orchestrate a patrol of the Bay of Bengal, in response to the threat of a German-inspired uprising in India and Burma. Psyche was hastily fitted out, provided with a ship's company consisting primarily of untrained sailors, and sailed on 16 August with HMAS Fantome for Singapore. From there, the ships sailed to Ragoon, arriving on 10 September with Psyche's captain, Commander Henry Feakes, under instructions to establish patrols along the Burmese coast with the two warships, plus three British India Steam Navigation Company vessels. Command of the Burma Coast Patrol was passed to Captain George Hutter of HMS Diana on 20 September, with Feakes appointed as Senior Naval Officer Burma and overall commander of the three British India vessels and ten coastal launches. For Psyche, 10- to 12-day patrols along the Burmese coast were the norm, interspersed with crew training duties.

On 17 January 1916, the demobilisation of the Burma Coast Patrol was ordered, as the threat of insurrection in India and Burma had ceased, and German machinations had focused on the Malay Peninsula. Psyche arrived at Penang on 28 January, then sailed three days later for Port Blair. From here, the ship performed patrols of Sumatra. On 12 February, seven stokers refused duty in protest over the poor quality of food being provided to the sailors aboard. All seven were found guilty of disobeying orders, and were punished with prison sentences between 12 and 14 months, plus dismissal from the RAN. The remaining stokers were supplemented by native personnel until 25 April, when replacement RAN personnel arrived. During March, the ship patrolled the Gulf of Siam, and escorted a Russian troop convoy sailing to Europe. During April, further patrols of the Bay of Bengal were made, before Psyche sailed to Hong Kong for inspection and refit. During the period from late 1915 to early 1916, Psyche served as escort to two ships carrying Turkish prisoners of war, was responsible for the transportation of two Chinese spies (one of whom escaped), and helped capture the ringleaders of an Indian soldiers' mutiny in Singapore.

During the refit period, personnel from Psyche were used to commission the river gunboat HMS Moorhen on 6 July, and then man her to evacuate European civilians from Canton. The gunboat was halfway up the Pearl River Delta when it was learned that the civilians had been recovered by another vessel, and returned to Hong Kong, where Moorhen decommissioned on 23 July. Also during July, sickness ran through the ship, with 67 personnel sent to the naval hospital ashore, while another 41 were treated aboard: about 60% of the ship's company were unfit for duty during this period. Recurring illnesses had been a problem while the ship operated in tropical climates, and the ship's surgeon recommended the ship be deployed to cooler regions. For one day, the reassignment of flag officers meant that Psyche was Flagship of the China Squadron.

Released from dockyard hands on 14 August, Psyche began patrols along the Chinese coast, with a marked improvement of the health of all aboard. These continued until 14 October, when the cruiser was assigned to Singapore for further patrols of the Bay of Bengal and Sumatra. In March and April 1917, she was assigned to escort duties between Burma and India. On 11 August, Psyche was relieved by HMS Suffolk, and sailed to Sydney, where she arrived on 28 September.

The ship was paid off on 16 October 1917. Psyche was reactivated on 20 November 1917 for service along Australia's north-east coast, but after uneventful patrols, she was decommissioned for the final time on 26 March 1918.

== Fate ==
The ship was sold to the Moreland Metal Company on 21 July 1922, who used her as a timber lighter. Psyche sank in 1940 at Salamander Bay, New South Wales, during a heavy storm, which rolled the ship onto her side. The wreck was used by RAN clearance divers for training between 1950 and 1973, and was later broken up during an underwater demolitions exercise. The remains sit 4.2 metres (14 ft) below sea level, around 200 metres (219 yd) off Roy Wood Reserve.

A memorial to the ship was unveiled at Roy Wood Reserve on 27 June 2015.
