= HMS Pandora (1900) =

Pelorus-class cruiser

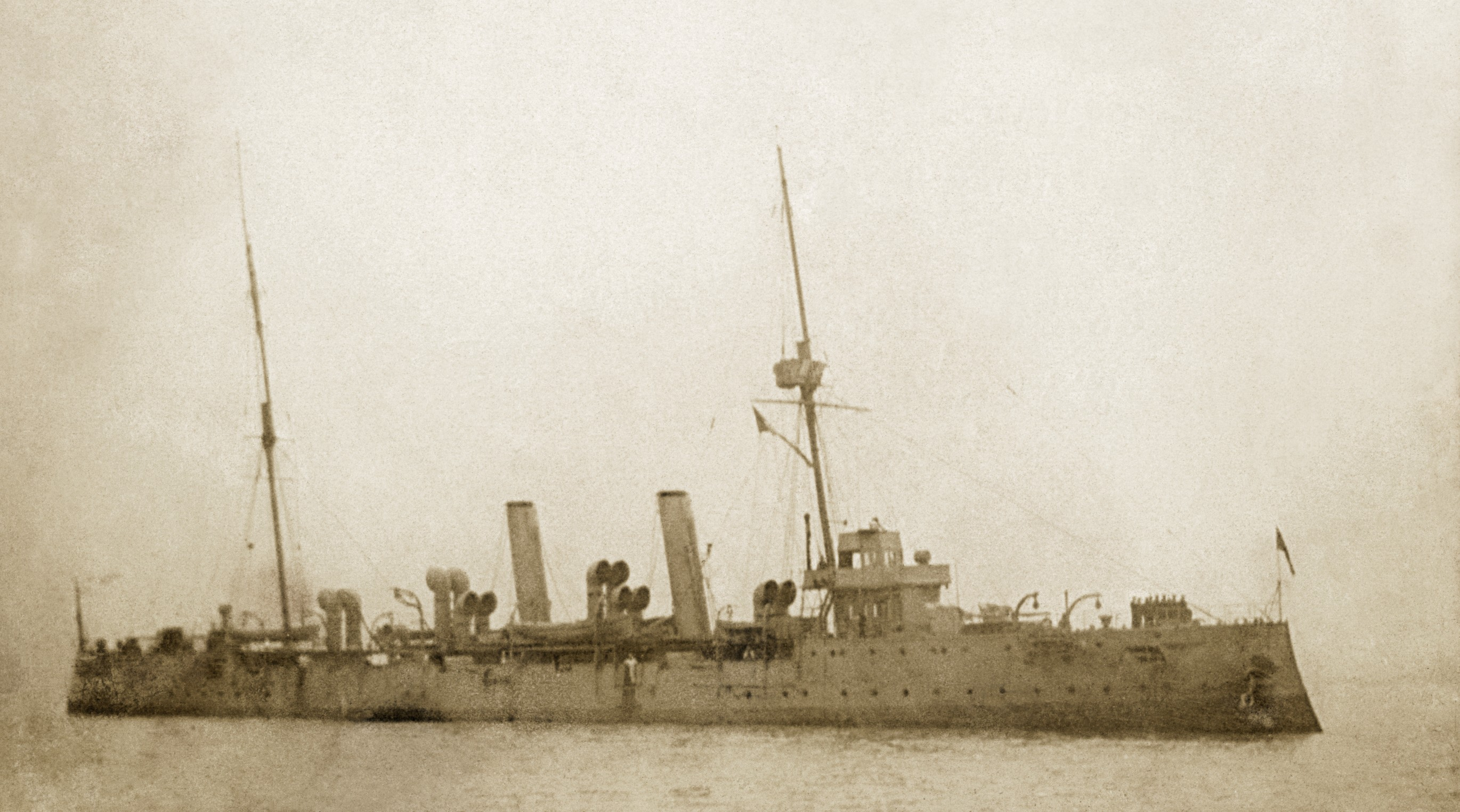
- HMS Pandora

History

United Kingdom
- Name: HMS Pandora
- Namesake: Pandora
- Builder: Portsmouth Dockyard, Hampshire
- Laid down: 3 January 1898
- Launched: 17 January 1900
- Christened: Mary Elizabeth, Mrs. Napier
- Fate: Sold for scrap, July 1913

General characteristics
- Class & type: Pelorus-class protected cruiser
- Displacement: 2135 tons
- Length: 313 ft 6 in (95.6 m) (overall)
- Beam: 36 ft 6 in (11.1 m)
- Draught: 16 ft 0 in (4.9 m)
- Propulsion: 2-shaft reciprocating triple-expansion engines, Blechynden boilers, 5000hp
- Speed: 20.7 knots (38.3 km/h) (trials); 18.5 knots (34.3 km/h) knots (service)
- Complement: 224
- Armament: 8 × 1 4-inch (102mm)/40 QF 25-pounder; 8 × 1 1.585in (57mm)/40 QF 3-pounder; 2 × 1 18 inch (450 mm) torpedo tubes
- Armour: 0.25in (gun shields); 2-1.5in (decks)

HMS Pandora was a Pelorus-class cruiser of the Royal Navy. There were eleven "Third class" protected cruisers in the class, which was designed by Sir William White. While well armed for their size, they were primarily workhorses for the overseas fleet on "police" duties and did not serve with the main battlefleet.

== Construction details ==
They displaced 2,135 tons, had a crew complement of 224 men and were armed with eight QF 4 inch (102 mm) (25 pounder) guns, eight 3 pounder guns, three machine guns, and two 18 inch (457 mm) torpedo tubes. With reciprocating triple expansion engines and a variety of boilers, the top speed was 20 knots (37 km/h).

== Service history ==
HMS Pandora was laid down at Portsmouth Dockyard on 3 January 1898, and launched on 17 January 1900, when she was christened by Mrs. (Mary Elizabeth) Napier, daughter of Admiral Sir Michael Culme-Seymour, Commander-in-Chief at Portsmouth (and herself wife of a Royal Navy officer who later became Vice-Admiral Sir Trevylyan Napier).

She was commissioned for the 1901 naval maneuvers, then carried out a series of propeller trials at Portsmouth under Commander Somerset Gough-Calthorpe, before she was paid off on 13 September 1901. On 7 November 1901 she was commissioned by Commander John Francis Murray-Aynsley to relieve HMS Melita on the Mediterranean Station, and she arrived at Malta early the following month. In June 1902 she visited Cyprus, in September that year she was in the Aegean Sea visiting Nauplia, and in February 1903 she was reported to be visiting Port Said.

In 1906, her Commander was William Sullivan, second son of Admiral Sir Francis Sullivan, 6th Baronet.

Pandora was sold for scrap in July 1913.
