= HMS Pelorus =

HMS Pelorus is the designation which has been given to numerous ships of the Royal Navy.

- HMS Pelorus (1808) was an 18-gun Cruizer-class brig-sloop launched in 1808 and wrecked in 1844 while transporting opium to China.
- HMS Pelorus (1857) was a 22-gun Pearl-class wooden screw corvette launched in 1857 and broken up for scrap in 1869.
- HMS Pelorus (1889), a Pearl-class light cruiser launched in 1889 and renamed HMS Mildura in 1890. She served on the Australia Station and was sold for scrap in 1906.
- HMS Pelorus (1896), a Pelorus-class protected cruiser launched in 1896 and sold for scrap in 1920.
- HMS Pelorus (J291), an Algerine-class minesweeper launched in 1943. She was sold to South Africa in 1947, becoming HMSAS Pietermaritzburg. She was scuttled on 12 November 1994 to make an artificial reef at Miller's Point near Simon's Town, South Africa.
