= HMS Pyramus (1897) =

Pelorus-class cruiser

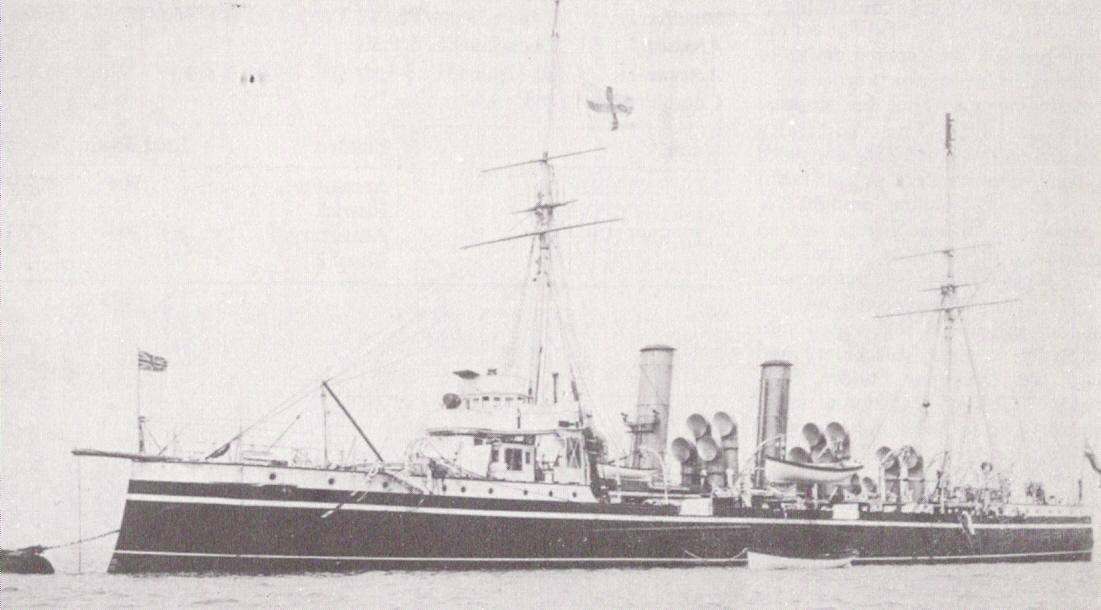
- HMS Pyramus ca. 1900.

History

United Kingdom
- Name: HMS Pyramus
- Builder: Palmers Shipbuilding and Iron Company, Jarrow
- Laid down: May 1896
- Launched: 15 May 1897
- Completed: 1900
- Fate: Sold for scrapping 21 April 1920

General characteristics
- Class & type: Pelorus-class third-class cruiser
- Displacement: 2,135 tons
- Length: 300 ft (91 m) between perpendiculars; 313 ft 6 in (95.55 m) length overall
- Beam: 36 ft 6 in (11.1 m)
- Draught: 16 ft (4.9 m)
- Installed power: Natural draught: 5,000 indicated horsepower (6.7 megawatts); Forced draught: 7,000 indicated horsepower (9.4 megawatts)
- Propulsion: Two shafts, three-cylinder triple expansion steam engines, 16 Reed water tube boilers, 500 tons coal
- Speed: Natural draught: 18.5 knots (34.25 km/h) maximum; Forced draught: 20 knots (37 km/h) maximum; After several years of service, average maximum speeds of class dropped to 16 to 17 knots (29.6 to 31.5 km/h)
- Complement: 224
- Armament: 8 × QF 4-inch (102 mm) guns; 8 × 3-pounder (47-mm) guns; 3 × machine guns; 2 × 18-inch (450-mm) torpedo tubes athwartships
- Armour: Deck: 1.5 to 2 inches (38.1 to 50.8 mm); Gunshields: 0.25 inch (6.35 mm); Conning tower: 3 inches (76.2 mm)

HMS Pyramus was a Pelorus-class protected cruiser of the Royal Navy. There were eleven "Third class" protected cruisers in the class, which was designed by Sir William White. While well armed for their size, they were primarily workhorses for the overseas fleet on "police" duties and did not serve with the main battlefleet.

They displaced 2,135 tons, had a crew complement of 224 men and were armed with eight QF 4-inch (102 mm, 25 pounder) guns, eight 3-pounder guns, three machine guns, and two 18-inch (457 mm) torpedo tubes. With reciprocating triple expansion engines and a variety of boilers, the top speed was 20 knots (37 km/h).

== Operational history ==
HMS Pyramus was laid down at Palmers Shipbuilding and Iron Company, Jarrow in May 1896, and launched on 15 May 1897.

In April 1900 she commissioned for service as a special torpedo vessel at the Mediterranean Station, replacing HMS Polyphemus, and taking her crew. She served in various colonial posts, including in the Mediterranean Fleet in 1901–03. Commander Alfred Ernest Albert Grant was appointed in command on 2 August 1901. In October 1902 she was reported to be visiting Suda Bay at Crete. The following year she paid off at the station headquarters at Malta on 4 February 1903, and recommissioned the following day with a new captain.

In 1914 she formed part of the escort for the New Zealand Force which occupied German Samoa (now Samoa). In July 1915 she was present at the Rufiji river delta action when the monitors HMS Severn and HMS Mersey destroyed the German cruiser SMS Königsberg. She was sold for scrap on 21 April 1920.
