= HMS Perseus (1897) =

Pelorus-class cruiser

History

United Kingdom
- Name: HMS Perseus
- Namesake: Perseus
- Builder: Earle's Shipbuilding, Hull
- Laid down: May 1896
- Launched: 15 July 1897
- Completed: 1901
- Fate: Sold for scrap, 26 May 1914

General characteristics
- Class & type: Pelorus-class cruiser
- Displacement: 2,135 long tons (2,169 t)
- Length: 313 ft 6 in (95.55 m) o/a; 300 ft (91 m) p/p
- Beam: 36 ft 6 in (11.13 m)
- Draught: 16 ft (4.9 m)
- Propulsion: 16 Thornycroft boilers; 3-cylinder Triple expansion engine, 2 shafts, 5,000 ihp (3,728 kW) natural draught, 7,000 ihp (5,220 kW) forced draught
- Speed: 18.5 kn (34.3 km/h; 21.3 mph) natural draught, 20 kn (37 km/h; 23 mph) forced draught
- Complement: 224
- Armament: 8 × QF 4 in (102 mm) guns; 8 × QF 3-pounder guns; 3 × machine guns; 2 × 18-inch (450 mm) torpedo tubes
- Armour: Deck: 1 1/2–2 in (38–51 mm) deck; Gunshields: 1/4 in (6.4 mm); Conning tower: 3 in (76 mm)

HMS Perseus was a Pelorus-class protected cruiser of the Royal Navy. There were eleven "Third class" protected cruisers in the class, which was designed by Sir William White. They mainly served at overseas stations rather than with the main fleets.

== Design ==
HMS Perseus displaced 2,135 tons, had a crew complement of 224 men and were armed with eight QF 4 inch (102 mm) guns, eight 3 pounder guns, three machine guns, and two 18 inch (457 mm) torpedo tubes. With reciprocating triple expansion engines fed by 14 Thornycroft boilers, the top speed was 20 knots (37 km/h).

== History ==
HMS Perseus was laid down at Earle's Shipbuilding, Hull, in May 1896, launched on 15 July 1897, and completed in 1901. Under the command of Commander Edmund Radcliffe Pears, she was in March 1901 commissioned to form part of the East Indies fleet, where she was often stationed in the Persian Gulf or the Gulf of Aden. In September 1901 she prevented the landing of Turkish troops at Kuwait, and in September 1902 she demolished the fort at Balhaf in response to pirate activities by the locals there.

HMS Perseus was sold for scrap on 26 May 1914.
