= HMAS Pioneer =

Pelorus-class protected cruiser built for the Royal Navy at the end of the 19th century

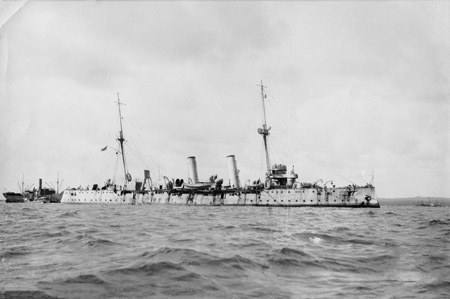
- HMAS Pioneer off East Africa in 1916

History

United Kingdom
- Name: Pioneer
- Builder: Chatham Dockyard, Kent
- Laid down: 16 December 1897
- Launched: 28 June 1899
- Completed: 23 January 1900
- Commissioned: 10 July 1900
- Decommissioned: 29 November 1912
- Fate: Transferred to Australia, 28 November 1912

Australia
- Name: Pioneer
- Acquired: 28 November 1912
- Commissioned: 1 March 1913
- Decommissioned: 7 November 1916
- Honours and awards: Battle honours: German East Africa 1915–16
- Fate: Scuttled, 18 February 1931

General characteristics
- Class & type: Pelorus-class cruiser
- Displacement: 2,200 long tons (2,200 t)
- Length: 313 ft 3 in (95.48 m) o/a; 305 ft (93 m) p/p
- Beam: 36 ft 9 in (11.20 m)
- Draught: 15 ft (4.6 m)
- Propulsion: Triple expansion engines, 2 shafts, 5,000 ihp (3,728 kW)
- Speed: 19.5 knots (36.1 km/h; 22.4 mph)
- Complement: 225 as designed
- Armament: 8 × QF 4 in (102 mm) guns; 8 × single QF 3-pounder guns; 2 field guns; 3 × Maxim machine guns; 2 × 14 in (356 mm) torpedo tubes
- Armour: Deck: 1 1/2–2 in (38–51 mm) deck; Gunshields: 1/4 in (6.4 mm); Conning tower: 3 in (76 mm)

HMAS Pioneer (formerly HMS Pioneer) was a Pelorus-class protected cruiser built for the Royal Navy at the end of the 19th century. She was transferred to the fledgling Royal Australian Navy (RAN) in 1912. During World War I, the cruiser captured two German merchant ships, and was involved in the East African Campaign, including the blockade of the cruiser SMS Königsberg and a bombardment of Dar-es-Salaam. She returned to Australia in late 1916 and was decommissioned. Pioneer was used as an accommodation ship for the following six years, then was stripped down and sold off by 1926. The cruiser was scuttled off Sydney Heads in 1931.

== Design and construction ==
Pioneer was a third-class protected cruiser of the nine-ship Pelorus or P class. These ships had a displacement of 2,200 tons, were 313 feet 3 inches (95.48 m) long overall and 305 feet (93 m) long between perpendiculars, had a beam of 36 feet 9 inches (11.20 m), and a draught of 15 feet (4.6 m). Propulsion was supplied by inverted three-cylinder triple expansion steam engines, providing 5,000 indicated horsepower (3,700 kW) to two propeller shafts. Although designed to reach speeds of 20 knots (37 km/h; 23 mph), Pioneer was only capable of 19.5 knots (36.1 km/h; 22.4 mph).

The cruiser was armed with eight single QF 4 in (100 mm) guns, eight single QF 3-pounder guns, two field guns, three Maxim machine guns, and two 14 in (356 mm) torpedo tubes sited above the waterline. The ship's company initially stood at 225, but this was later reduced to 188; 12 officers, and 176 sailors.

Pioneer was laid down for the Royal Navy at HM Dockyard, Chatham, Kent on 16 December 1897. She was launched 28 June 1899 by Miss Andoe, daughter of the dockyard's admiral superintendent. Pioneer underwent steaming trials on 2 September making 17.6 knots during six runs over the measured mile off Maplin Sands. The cruiser was completed on 23 January 1900, and was placed in reserve until her commissioning on 10 July 1900.

== Operational history ==
Pioneer spent the majority of 1900 in British waters, before sailing for the Mediterranean Fleet under the command of Commander Hugh Evan-Thomas on 15 November. Commander George Hope was appointed in command on 5 July 1902, taking up the command later that month after a visit by the ship to Brindisi. In late December 1902 she was in Greek waters when she visited Astakos in the Ionian Sea with HMS Irresistible and HMS Bulwark. Early the following year she took part in a three-weeks cruise with other ships of her squadron in the Greek islands around Corfu. While there, Pioneer collided with the cruiser HMS Orwell on 30 January 1903, during night exercises near Corfu. Orwell's bow was cut off in the collision with the loss of 15 of her crew.

The ship remained in the Mediterranean until returning to Chatham on 20 November 1904. Pioneer was decommissioned until 5 September 1905, when she was reactivated for service as a drill ship with the Australian Squadron of the Royal Navy.

On 29 November 1912, Pioneer was decommissioned and gifted to the Government of Australia, who commissioned the ship as part of the Royal Australian Navy on 1 March 1913. Initially used as a tender for the naval base at Garden Island, New South Wales, Pioneer was refitted during the second half of 1913, and on 1 January 1914, was reassigned for reservist training.

At the start of World War I, Pioneer sailed from Victoria to Western Australia, where she served as a patrol vessel. On 16 August, she captured the German merchant ship Neumunster, which was taken by the Australian government as a prize of war and renamed Cooee. Ten days later, the cruiser captured a second German ship, the Norddeutscher Lloyd liner Thuringen, which was presented to the government of India for use as a troop transport. On 1 November, Pioneer joined the escort of the convoy transporting the Australian and New Zealand Army Corps to Egypt as a replacement for the Japanese cruiser Nisshin, and with orders to check on the Cocos Islands during the voyage. However, as the Australian warship took up position, she suffered a major engine malfunction, and HMAS Sydney joined the convoy instead.

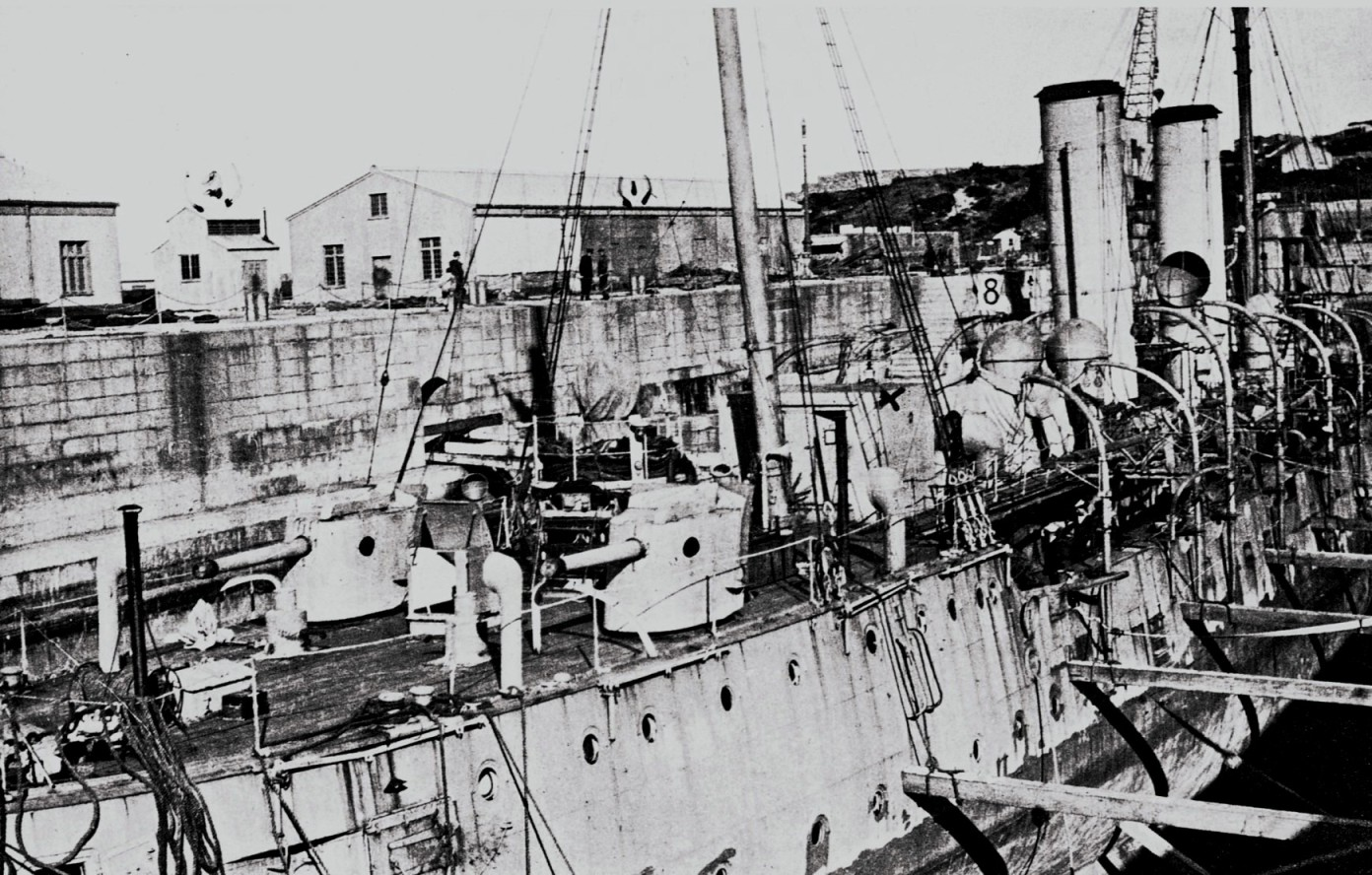
Pioneer undergoing refit in Simon's Town, South Africa during late 1915

In late December, the cruiser was assigned to the blockade of German East Africa, and sailed for Zanzibar on 9 January 1915. On arrival, Pioneer was ordered to help contain the German cruiser SMS Königsberg in the Rufiji River and prevent German supply ships from arriving. Königsberg was scuttled on 12 July following shelling by two monitors, although Pioneer remained in the region until 31 August, when she sailed to Simon's Town in South Africa for a six-week refit. Pioneer returned to uneventful patrols of German East Africa on 22 October, and continued until early February 1916, when the Admiralty instructed the ship to return to Australia. However, before she could leave, demands by General Jan Smuts for more Admiralty involvement in the East African Campaign saw Pioneer return to patrols on 24 February. On 30 July, the cruiser fired 100 4-inch shells during the bombardment of Dar-es-Salaam.

== Decommissioning and fate ==
Pioneer was ordered to return to Australia on 8 August 1916, and was paid off on 7 November 1916. Despite being "obsolete and decrepit" she saw more actual combat than any other Australian ship of World War I. Pioneer returned to Garden Island and was used as an accommodation vessel until 1922. She was handed to Cockatoo Island Dockyard for stripping in May 1923, was passed to the control of the Commonwealth Shipping Board in 1924, who then sold the hulk to H. P. Stacey of Sydney, in 1926. The ship was scuttled off Sydney Heads on 18 February 1931.

== Wreck ==
The location of the wreck was lost until March 2014, when it was rediscovered by wreck-hunters analysing data taken from the research vessel Southern Surveyor. Pioneer's wreck sits 67 metres (219 ft 10 in) below sea level, at 33°51.850′S 151°19.844′E, approximately 4 kilometres (2.2 nmi; 2.5 mi) east of Vaucluse. The wreck lies with the bow towards the south-east, and is intact in places, with structures rising up to 5 metres (16 ft 5 in) from the sea floor.

== Honours and awards ==
Following a reorganisation of the RAN battle honours system, completed in March 2010, Pioneer was retroactively awarded the honour "German East Africa 1915–16" in recognition of her wartime service.
