= Edmund Radcliffe Pears =

Royal Navy Vice-Admiral (1862–1941)

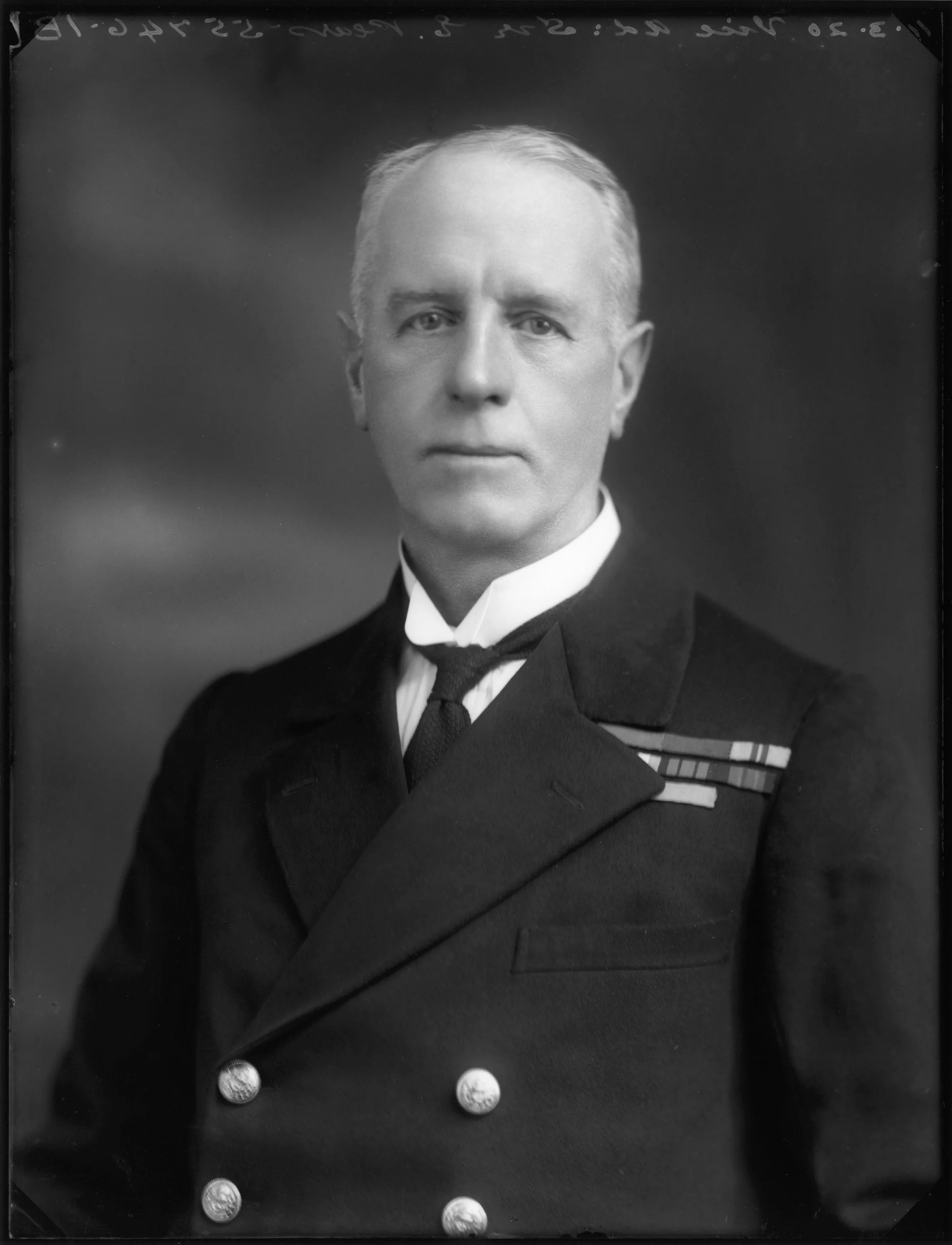
Pears in 1920

Vice-Admiral Sir Edmund Radcliffe Pears, KBE, CB (25 April 1862 – 21 June 1941) was a British Royal Navy officer, who served in the First World War.

== Naval service ==
Pears joined the Royal Navy, where he was promoted to lieutenant on 30 June 1885. He took part in the Benin Expedition of 1897, for which he was promoted to commander on 25 May 1897.

He was appointed in command of the protected cruiser HMS Perseus in early 1901, when the ship was commissioned to form part of the East Indies fleet. He was in charge when in September 1901 she prevented the landing of Turkish troops at Kuwait. The following year he was in charge when troops from the Perseus demolished the fort at Balhaf in response to pirate activities by the locals there.
