= HMS Pelorus (1896) =

Pelorus-class cruiser

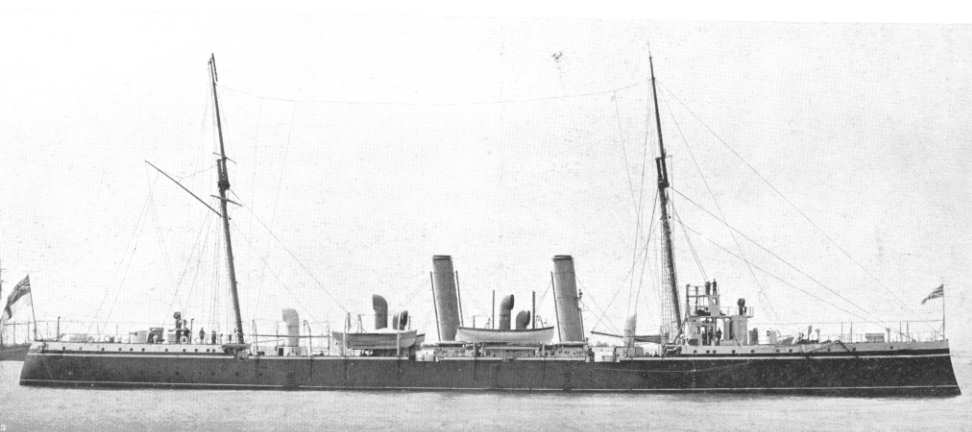
- HMS Pelorus

History

United Kingdom
- Name: HMS Pelorus
- Namesake: Pelorus
- Builder: Sheerness Dockyard, Kent
- Laid down: May 1895
- Launched: 15 December 1896
- Commissioned: 1897
- Fate: Sold for scrap, 1920

General characteristics
- Class & type: Pelorus-class cruiser
- Displacement: 2,135 long tons (2,169 t)
- Length: 313 ft 6 in (95.55 m) o/a; 300 ft (91 m) p/p
- Beam: 36 ft 6 in (11.13 m)
- Draught: 16 ft (4.9 m)
- Propulsion: Triple expansion engine, 2 shafts, 5,000 ihp (3,728 kW)
- Speed: 20 knots (37 km/h; 23 mph)
- Complement: 224
- Armament: 8 × QF 4 in (100 mm) guns; 8 × QF 3-pounder guns; 3 × machine guns; 2 × 18-inch (450 mm) torpedo tubes
- Armour: 0.25in (gun shields); 2-1.5in (decks)

HMS Pelorus was the first of the Pelorus-class cruisers, and was laid down at Sheerness dockyard in 1895. Completed and commissioned into the Royal Navy in 1897, she was designed by Sir William White. Construction cost £154,315. The ship was well armed for her size, but was primarily a workhorse for the overseas fleet.

HMS Pelorus displaced 2,135 tons and had a top speed of 20 knots (37 km/h). She had reciprocating triple expansion engines and Normand water-tube boilers which could give 7,000 horsepower (5,200 kW) for limited periods of time with forced draught, and 5,000 horsepower (3,700 kW) under natural draught. It carried a crew complement of 224 men and it was armed with eight QF 4 inch (102 mm) (25 pounder) guns, eight QF 3 pounder (47-mm) guns, three machine guns, and two 18-inch (450-mm) torpedo tubes.

== Service history ==
Pelorus served in the Channel Fleet under Captain Henry Charles Bertram Hulbert, when in February 1900 she joined the Eastern division of the fleet.

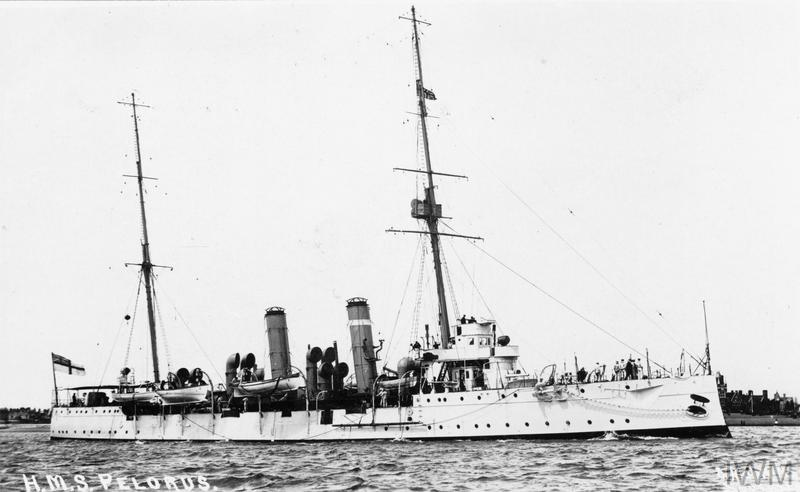
Protected cruiser HMS Pelorus during WWI

In 1901, the ship was stationed at Gibraltar under the command of Commander Ernest Troubridge. The following year she paid off at Devonport, had her boilers repaired, and in August was towed to Clydebank to be refitted by Messrs J. Brown and Co. in Glasgow.

In 1906, the ship was assigned to the Cape of Good Hope Station under the command of Commander James C. Tancred. In 1908 the captain was Arthur W Craig.
