= Alfred Ernest Albert Grant =

Royal Navy Admiral (1861–1933)

Portrait by Walter Stoneman, 1918

Admiral Alfred Ernest Albert Grant (10 April 1861 – 14 August 1933) was a Royal Navy officer. During the First World War, he played an important role in shipbuilding.

== Career ==
Grant was the sixth son of John Glasgow Grant, CMG, sometime Speaker of the House of Assembly of Barbados. He entered HMS Britannia as a colonial cadet in 1874, and took part in the Anglo-Egyptian War of 1882. He was promoted to lieutenant on 30 June 1884, and to commander on 30 June 1896.

He was appointed in command of the protected cruiser HMS Pyramus on 2 August 1901, while she was stationed in the Mediterranean Fleet. In October 1902 she was reported to be visiting Suda Bay at Crete, and the following year he paid her off at the station headquarters at Malta on 4 February 1903.
