= Alfred Grant (politician) =

American politician

Alfred Grant (1840-March 24, 1883) was a politician who served in the state legislature in Florida. He was a councilman, served as mayor, and was tax assessor in LaVilla near Jacksonville, Florida during the 1870s. He represented Duval County in 1875 and 1877 in the Florida House of Representatives.

He was one of at least 16 African Americans who represented Duval County in the Florida House of Representatives in the second half of the 19th century.

== See also ==
- African American officeholders from the end of the Civil War until before 1900
