= SMS Königsberg (1905) =

Light cruiser of the German Imperial Navy

Coordinates: 7°52′6″S 39°14′24″E

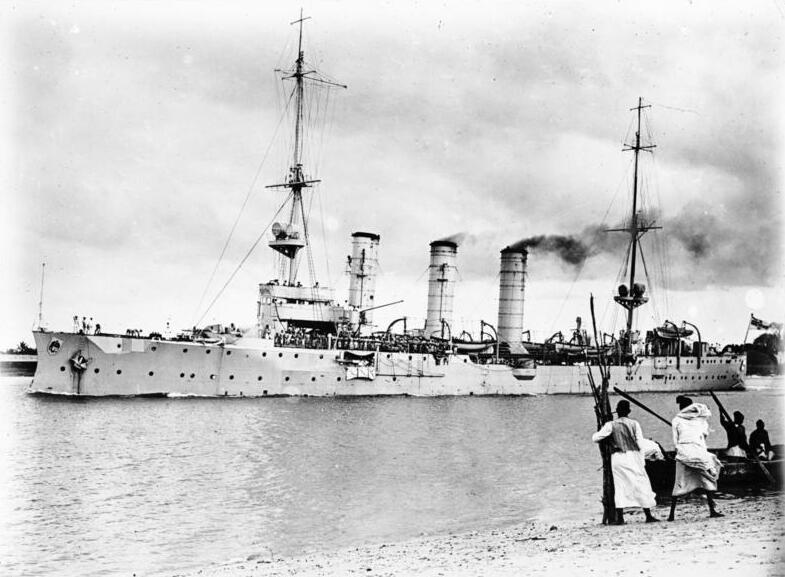
- SMS Königsberg at Dar es Salaam

History

German Empire
- Name: Königsberg
- Namesake: Königsberg, East Prussia
- Builder: Kaiserliche Werft, Kiel
- Laid down: 12 January 1905
- Launched: 12 December 1905
- Commissioned: 6 April 1907
- Fate: Scuttled 11 July 1915

General characteristics
- Class & type: Königsberg-class cruiser
- Displacement: Normal: 3,390 t (3,340 long tons); Full load: 3,814 t (3,754 long tons)
- Length: 115.3 m (378 ft 3 in)
- Beam: 13.2 m (43 ft 4 in)
- Draft: 5.29 m (17 ft 4 in)
- Installed power: 13,200 PS (9,700 kW); 11 × water-tube boilers
- Propulsion: 2 × screw propellers; 2 × triple-expansion engines
- Speed: 24.1 knots (44.6 km/h; 27.7 mph)
- Range: 5,750 nmi (10,650 km; 6,620 mi) at 12 knots (22 km/h; 14 mph)
- Complement: 14 officers; 308 enlisted men
- Armament: 10 × 10.5 cm (4.1 in) guns; 10 × 5.2 cm (2.0 in) SK L/55 guns; 2 × 45 cm (17.7 in) torpedo tubes
- Armor: Deck: 80 mm (3.1 in); Conning tower: 100 mm (3.9 in)

SMS Königsberg ("His Majesty's Ship Königsberg") was the lead ship of her class of light cruisers built by the German Kaiserliche Marine (Imperial Navy). (Note: "SMS" stands for "Seiner Majestät Schiff" (German: His Majesty's Ship).) Named after Königsberg, (Note: Now Kaliningrad, Russia.) the capital of East Prussia, she was laid down in January 1905, launched in December of that year and completed by June 1906. Her class included three other ships: Stettin, Stuttgart, and Nürnberg. Königsberg was armed with a main battery of ten 10.5-centimeter (4.1 in) guns and had a top speed of 24.1 knots (44.6 km/h; 27.7 mph).

After her commissioning, Königsberg served with the High Seas Fleet's reconnaissance force. During this period, she frequently escorted Kaiser Wilhelm II's yacht on visits to foreign countries. In April 1914, the ship was sent on what was to have been a two-year deployment to German East Africa, but this was interrupted by the outbreak of World War I in August of that year. Königsberg initially attempted to raid British and French commercial traffic in the region, but only destroyed one merchant ship in the course of her career. Coal shortages hampered her ability to attack shipping. On 20 September 1914, she surprised and sank the British protected cruiser HMS Pegasus in the Battle of Zanzibar.

Königsberg then retreated into the Rufiji River to repair her engines. Before the repairs could be completed, British cruisers located Königsberg, and, unable to steam into the river to destroy her, set up a blockade. After several attempts to sink the ship during the Battle of Rufiji Delta, the British sent two monitors, Mersey and Severn, to destroy the German cruiser. On 11 July 1915, the two monitors got close enough to severely damage Königsberg, forcing her crew to scuttle the ship. The surviving crew salvaged all ten of her main guns and joined Lieutenant Colonel Paul von Lettow-Vorbeck's guerrilla campaign in East Africa. Königsberg was partially broken up in 1963–1965 for scrap, and the remains sank into the riverbed.

== Design ==
Königsberg and her sisters were designed to serve both as fleet scouts in home waters and in Germany's colonial empire. This was a result of budgetary constraints that prevented the Kaiserliche Marine (Imperial Navy) from building more specialized cruisers suitable for both roles. The Königsberg class was an iterative development of the preceding Bremen class. All four members of the class were intended to be identical, but after the initial vessel was begun, the design staff incorporated lessons from the Russo-Japanese War. These included internal rearrangements and a lengthening of the hull.

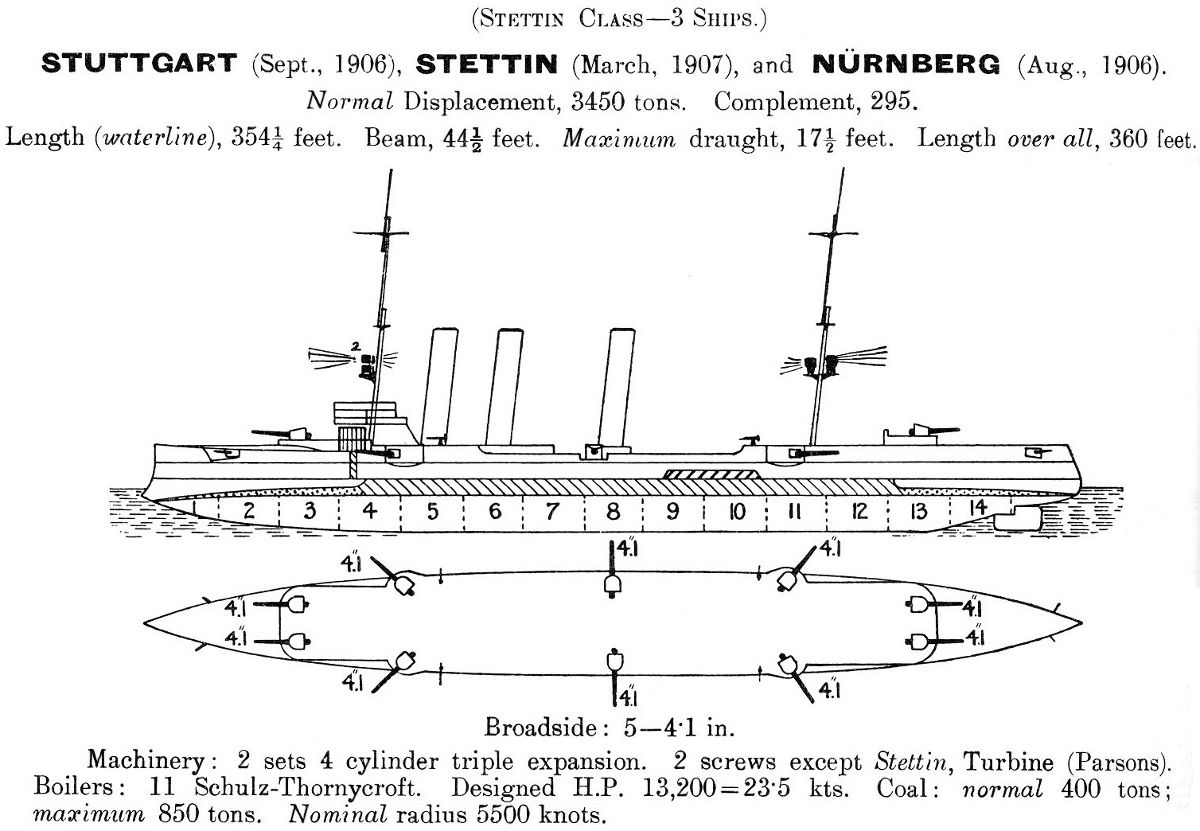
Plan and profile drawing of the Königsberg class (Note: The diagram mistakenly refers to the class as the Stettin class and does not include Königsberg)

Königsberg was 115.3 meters (378 ft 3 in) long overall and had a beam of 13.2 m (43 ft 4 in) and a draft of 5.29 m (17 ft 4 in) forward. She displaced 3,390 t (3,340 long tons; 3,740 short tons) normally and up to 3,814 t (3,754 long tons; 4,204 short tons) at full load. The ship had a minimal superstructure, which consisted of a small conning tower and bridge structure. Her hull had a raised forecastle and quarterdeck, along with a pronounced ram bow. She was fitted with two pole masts. Königsberg had a crew of 14 officers and 308 enlisted men.

Her propulsion system consisted of two 3-cylinder triple-expansion steam engines that drove a pair of screw propellers. Steam was provided by eleven coal-fired water-tube boilers that were vented through three funnels. The ship's propulsion system was rated to produce 13,200 metric horsepower (9,700 kW) for a top speed of 23 knots (43 km/h; 26 mph), though she exceeded these figures in service. Normal coal storage amounted to 400 t (390 long tons; 440 short tons). At a more economical pace of 12 knots (22 km/h; 14 mph), the ship had a range of approximately 5,750 nautical miles (10,650 km; 6,620 mi).

The ship was armed with a main battery of ten 10.5 cm (4.1 in) SK L/40 guns in single pedestal mounts. There were two side by side forward on the forecastle; six on the broadside, three on either side; and two side by side aft. The guns had a maximum elevation of 30 degrees, which allowed them to engage targets out to 12,700 m (41,700 ft). They were supplied with 1,500 rounds of ammunition, for 150 shells per gun. Königsberg also carried ten 5.2 cm (2 in) SK guns in single mounts. She was also equipped with a pair of 45 cm (17.7 in) torpedo tubes with five torpedoes submerged in the hull on the broadside.

The ship was protected by a curved armor deck that was 80 mm (3.1 in) thick amidships. The deck sloped downward at the sides, with a thickness of 45 mm (1.8 in), to provide protection against enemy fire. The conning tower sides were 100 mm (3.9 in) thick. Her main battery guns were fitted with 50 mm (2 in) thick gun shields.

== Service history ==
=== Construction and early career ===
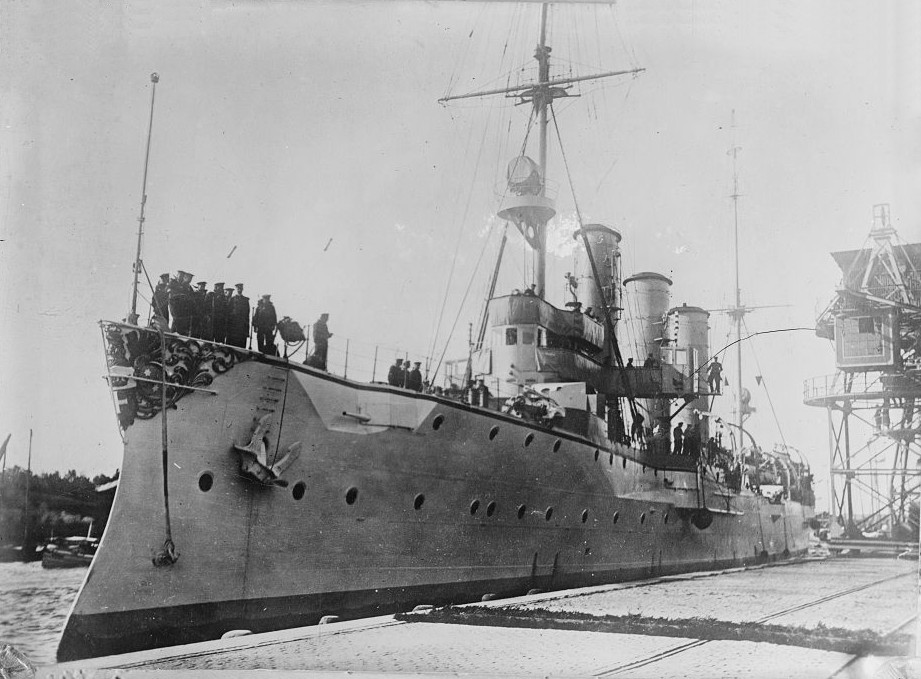
Pre-war photo of Königsberg

Königsberg was ordered under the contract name "Ersatz Meteor" and was laid down at the Imperial Dockyard in Kiel on 12 January 1905. (Note: German warships were ordered under provisional names. Additions to the fleet were given a single letter; ships intended to replace older or lost vessels were ordered as "Ersatz (name of the ship to be replaced)".) She was launched on 12 December 1905, when the Oberbürgermeister of Königsberg, Siegfried Körte, christened the ship, after which fitting-out work commenced. She was commissioned into the High Seas Fleet for sea trials on 6 April 1907. Her trials were interrupted at the beginning of June when she was tasked with escorting Kaiser Wilhelm II's yacht Hohenzollern during three sailing regattas including Kiel Week. The two ships then cruised the North Sea and stopped at Nordkapp, where from 3 to 6 August, Wilhelm II met Czar Nicholas II of Russia. After returning to Germany, Königsberg resumed her sea trials, which lasted from 9 August to 9 September. She visited her namesake city from 21 to 23 September and was later assigned to the fleet scouting forces to replace the cruiser Medusa on 5 November. At this time, Königsberg was again used to escort Wilhelm II's yacht, this time in company with the new armored cruiser Scharnhorst and the dispatch boat Sleipner on a visit to Britain. The ships stopped in Portsmouth and the Thames, and were visited by Queen Wilhelmina of the Netherlands.

On 17 December, Königsberg was tasked with another goodwill visit, this time escorting the Kaiser's brother, Prince Heinrich, and a delegation of naval officers to Malmö, Sweden to meet King Oscar II. The visit lasted until 20 December. Königsberg participated in the normal peacetime routine of individual and squadron training for 1908 without incident. The year ended with a major training cruise, first in the Baltic and North Sea and later into the Atlantic, that ended in early December. The ship then went into drydock over the winter of 1908–09 for periodic maintenance, emerging for service again in early February 1909. A typical training routine followed for the next two years, interrupted only by a collision with the new cruiser Dresden on 16 February 1910 in the Kiel Bay, and two trips escorting the Kaiser in 1910; the first to Helgoland on 9–13 March and the second to Britain from 8 to 27 May. The collision with Dresden caused significant damage to both ships, though no one on either vessel was injured. Both ships were repaired in Kiel. Königsberg also won the Kaiser's Schießpreis (Shooting Prize) for excellent gunnery in the reconnaissance force during this period. From December 1909 to September 1910, Fregattenkapitän (Frigate Captain) Adolf von Trotha served as the ship's commander.

From 8 March to 22 May 1911, Königsberg cruised in the Mediterranean Sea with Wilhelm II aboard Hohenzollern. On 10 June, Königsberg was replaced in the reconnaissance force by the new cruiser Kolberg; Königsberg was transferred to Danzig, where she was placed out of service on 14 June for modernization work. On 22 January 1913, the ship was recommissioned for service with the fleet, to replace the cruiser Mainz which was also being modernized. This service lasted until 19 June, when Königsberg was again placed in reserve in Kiel. During this period of active service, she was assigned to the training squadron from 1 to 18 April. In early 1914, the high command decided to send Königsberg to German East Africa, where she would replace the current station ship, the old unprotected cruiser Geier.

=== East Africa station ===
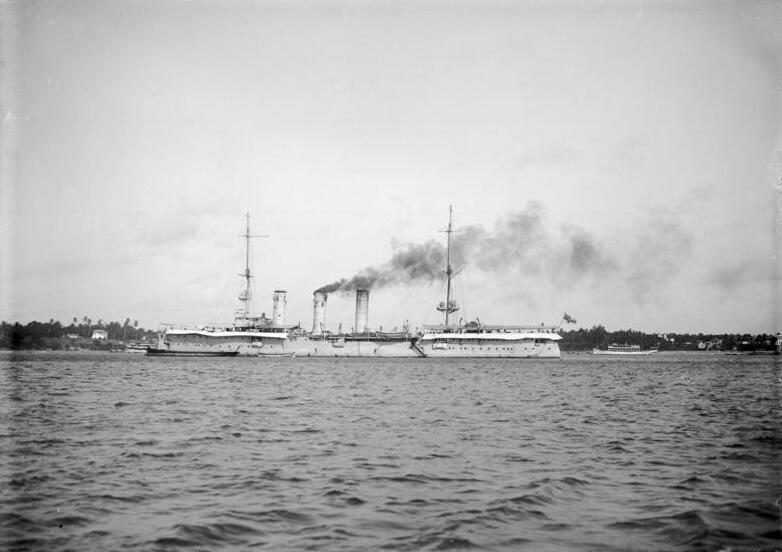
SMS Königsberg at Bagamoyo, June 1914

On 1 April 1914, Fregattenkapitän Max Looff took command of the ship. Königsberg left Kiel on 25 April, stopped in Wilhelmshaven, and then left three days later for a two-year deployment to German East Africa. She steamed into the Mediterranean Sea and stopped in Spanish and Italian ports before entering the Suez Canal. After passing through the canal, she stopped briefly in Aden before arriving in Dar es Salaam, the capital of German East Africa, on 5 June. Two days later, the Schutztruppe (Protection Force) celebrated their 25th anniversary in the colony; the deputy commander of the Schutztruppe presented Looff with a model of the cruiser Schwalbe, which had been the longest serving warship with the unit. Königsberg surveyed the harbor at Bagamoyo later in the year. The African colonial subjects considered the ship to be quite impressive, particularly her three funnels, which were assumed to signify a warship more powerful than one with only two funnels. The ship acquired the nickname Manowari na bomba tatu, or "the man of war with three pipes".

As tensions in Europe rose in the aftermath of the assassination of Archduke Franz Ferdinand of Austria, Looff decided to abandon the normal peacetime training schedule and returned to Dar es Salaam on 24 July to replenish his coal and other stores. He also made efforts to organize a coast watcher network to report enemy ships and to protect German shipping in the area. On 27 July, Looff received a message from the Admiralstab (Admiralty Staff) informing him of the worsening political situation in Europe. Concurrently, the cruisers of the British Cape Squadron, HMS Astraea, Hyacinth, and Pegasus, arrived with the intention of bottling up Königsberg at the colony's capital Dar es Salaam. Looff got his ship ready to sail and left port on the afternoon of 31 July 1914, with the three slower British ships shadowing him. Looff used a rain squall and his ship's superior speed to break contact with his British pursuers the following day. Königsberg steamed off Aden until 5 August, when word of the outbreak of hostilities between Britain and Germany belatedly reached the ship.

==== World War I ====
At the outbreak of World War I, Königsberg was ordered to attack British commerce around the entrance to the Red Sea. A lack of coal hampered Looff's efforts; the British prevented his collier Koenig from leaving Dar es Salaam and purchased all the coal in Portuguese East Africa to deny it to Königsberg. Looff then radioed the German steamer Zieten to warn her against using the Suez Canal, where she would have been confiscated. Königsberg chased after the German freighter Goldenfels, whose officers mistook the ship for a British cruiser and refused to stop. Königsberg was forced to fire a warning shot across the bow of Goldenfels to force the ship to stop so that Looff could warn her captain of the state of war.

On 6 August, Königsberg found a British ship off the coast of Oman, the freighter City of Winchester. A prize crew took the ship along with Königsberg, and the two vessels met Zieten four days later in the Khuriya Muriya Islands, where coal from City of Winchester was transferred to Königsberg. The freighter was thereafter sunk. The British crew was taken aboard Zieten, which departed the following day and stopped in Mozambique. Meanwhile, the steamer Somali, under the command of Korvettenkapitän (Corvette Captain) Zimmer, had left Dar es Salaam with a cargo of 1,200 t (1,200 long tons; 1,300 short tons) of coal on the night of 3–4 August to resupply Königsberg; the two ships met ten days later. By the time Looff rendezvoused with Somali, his ship was down to a mere 14 t (14 long tons; 15 short tons) of coal. Somali transferred some 850 t (840 long tons; 940 short tons) of coal to the cruiser, which permitted a sweep to Madagascar. No British or French ships were found, however, and so Königsberg met Somali again on 23 August and took on coal for four days of cruising.

In the meantime, British warships bombarded Dar es Salaam and destroyed the German wireless station there. By this time, Königsberg's engines required a thorough overhaul, and Looff needed to find a secluded area where the work could be completed. He settled on the Rufiji Delta, which had recently been surveyed by the survey ship Möwe. On 3 September 1914 at high tide, Königsberg passed over the bar at the mouth of the Rufiji and slowly made her way up the river. Coast watchers were stationed at the mouth of the river and telegraph lines were run to ensure the Germans would not be surprised by British ships searching for them. Zimmer, who was sending small coastal steamers to resupply Königsberg, observed a British cruiser—Pegasus—patrolling the coast for two weeks. He deduced that the ship would likely have to coal at Zanzibar on Sundays, and so Looff decided to attack the ship in port before he began his overhaul. He considered the action justified, since Britain had rejected a German proposal to keep central Africa neutral according to the Congo Act of 1885.

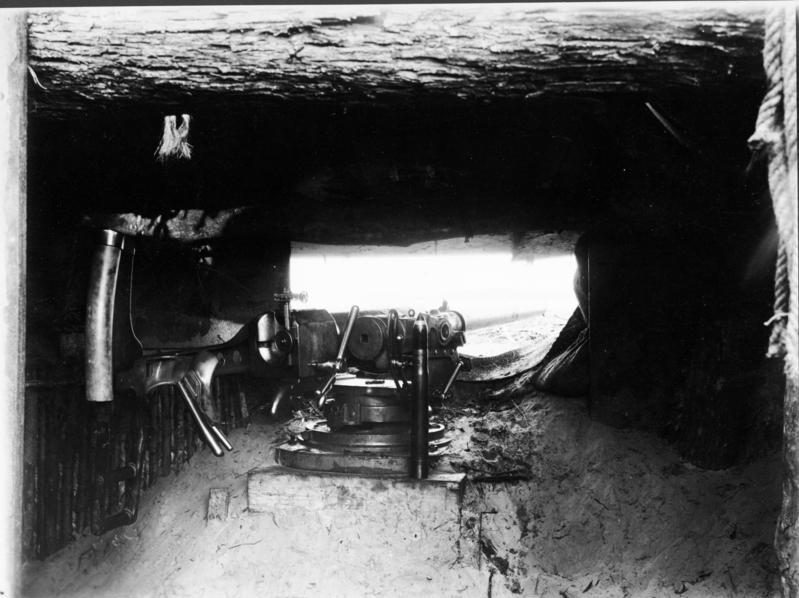
One of Königsberg's guns emplaced in the delta

On 19 September, Königsberg left the Rufiji and arrived off Zanzibar the following morning. She opened fire at a range of about 7,000 meters (23,000 ft) at 05:10, starting the Battle of Zanzibar; within 45 minutes, Pegasus caught fire, rolled over to port, and sank. Crewmen aboard Pegasus had raised a white flag, but it could not be seen aboard Königsberg due to the heavy smoke. Pegasus's crew suffered 38 dead and 55 wounded, while Königsberg was undamaged and had no casualties. After sinking Pegasus, Königsberg bombarded the wireless station and dumped barrels filled with sand into the harbor entrance to simulate mines. While leaving the harbor, Königsberg spotted the picket ship Helmuth and sank her with three shells.

The cruiser then returned to the Rufiji River so work could begin on overhauling her engines; the parts would need to be transported overland to the shipyard in Dar es Salaam where they could be rebuilt. While moored in the town of Salale, the ship was heavily camouflaged and defensive arrangements were erected. These included positioning soldiers and field guns to defend the approaches to the cruiser and establishing a network of coast watchers and telegraph lines to watch for hostile ships. An improvised minefield was also laid in the delta to keep the British ships from entering the river.

Concerned with the threat Königsberg posed to troop transports from India, the British reinforced the flotilla tasked with tracking down the elusive German raider, and placed the ships under the command of Captain Sidney R. Drury-Lowe. The sinking of Pegasus convinced the British that Königsberg must still be in German East Africa. On 19 October, the cruiser Chatham found the German East Africa Line ship Präsident at Lindi. A boarding party searched the ship and discovered documents indicating she had supplied Königsberg with coal in the Rufiji the previous month. On 30 October, the cruiser Dartmouth located Königsberg and Somali in the delta. The cruisers Chatham, Dartmouth, and Weymouth blockaded the Rufiji Delta to ensure Königsberg could not escape.

===== Battle of Rufiji Delta =====
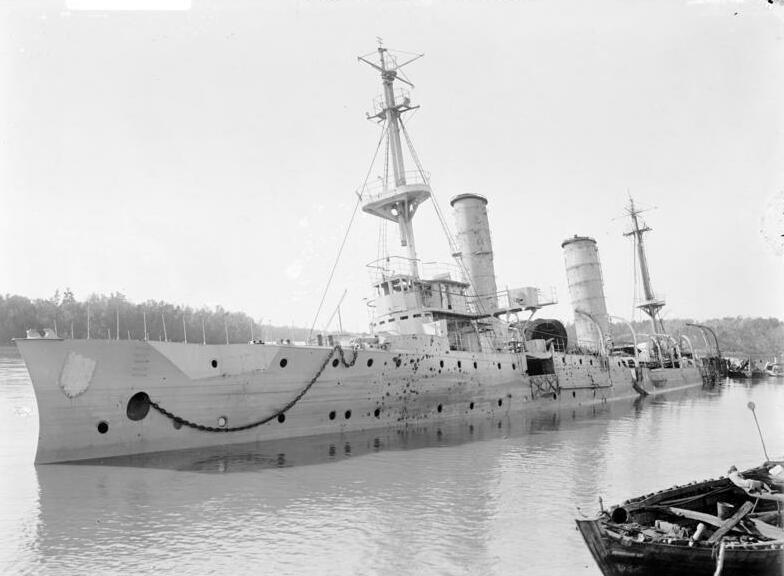
The battered Königsberg after she was scuttled

On 3 November, the British began a bombardment in an attempt to destroy or neutralize Königsberg and Somali. Königsberg was protected by the thick mangrove swamps, which concealed the ship and offered a degree of cover from British shellfire, especially while the British ships remained outside the river. A collier, Newbridge, was converted into a blockship to be sunk in the main channel of the delta to prevent Königsberg's escape. Despite heavy German fire from both sides of the river, the British successfully sank Newbridge across one of the delta mouths on 10 November, though the German raider could still put to sea via other channels. Looff decided to move his ship further upriver, to make it more difficult for the British to destroy her. In doing so, his ship would occupy a disproportionate number of British vessels that could otherwise have been employed elsewhere. In the course of the campaign, the British reinforced the squadron blockading the Rufiji with additional cruisers, including Pyramus and the Australian HMAS Pioneer.

The British naval operation was distantly directed by Admiral Herbert King-Hall, the commander-in-chief of the Cape Town station. He discovered that two Curtiss flying boats were at Durban, owned by a mining engineer. Hiring one of them, King-Hall gave their civilian pilot, Dennis Cutler, a temporary commission into the Royal Naval Air Service and requisitioned the passenger ship Kinfauns Castle to serve as a makeshift tender. On 19 November, on his first attempt to locate the cruiser, Cutler, who did not have a compass, got lost and was forced to land on the sea. On his second flight, on 22 November, he successfully located Königsberg, and a third flight with a Royal Navy observer confirmed his observations. His aircraft's radiator was damaged on the flight by ground fire and he was grounded until it could be repaired with one from a Ford car. A further flight on 10 December ended when the aircraft was brought down by ground fire and engine failure, resulting in Cutler's capture. A pair of Sopwith Type 807 seaplanes with Royal Naval Air Service crews arrived on 21 February, with the intention of scouting and even bombing the ship. These underpowered aircraft were found to be unable to take off with even a minimal bomb load and one was wrecked within a few days. In late April, a trio of Short Folder seaplanes fared a little better, but were able to photograph Königsberg, before they were quickly disabled by the conditions.

Aerial photo of Königsberg after her scuttling; note the removal of her guns

Also in November, the British sought to use the 12-inch (305 mm) guns of the old battleship Goliath to sink the cruiser. The attempt was unsuccessful, once again because the shallow waters prevented the battleship from getting within range. In December, Oberstleutnant (Lieutenant Colonel) Paul von Lettow-Vorbeck requested as many crew members from the ship as possible for the East African campaign against the British; a total of 220 men were left aboard to keep the ship in fighting condition. This was not enough, however, to permit the ship to go to sea. Königsberg moved further up the river on 18 December. On 23 December, the British used a pair of shallow-draft ships to sail up the delta. They hit Somali once before German defensive fire forced them to retreat.

In the meantime, conditions were deteriorating on Königsberg. There were shortages of coal, ammunition, food, and medical supplies. Although safe from the British, the crew was ravaged by malaria and other tropical ailments. Generally cut off from the outside world, the morale of the sailors fell. However, the situation was marginally improved with a scheme to resupply the ship and give her a fighting chance to return home. A captured British merchant ship, Rubens, was renamed Kronborg. It was given a Danish flag, papers, and a crew of German sailors selected for their ability to speak Danish. It was then packed with coal, field guns, ammunition, small arms, and various supplies. As the freighter approached East Africa, Königsberg prepared to sortie to meet the ship and attempt to break out and return to Germany. Instead, Königsberg was trapped in the river by two cruisers and several smaller vessels. Hyacinth intercepted Kronborg as she approached, and chased her to Manza Bay. The trapped ship was forced aground and set on fire, but the Germans salvaged much of her cargo and put it to use later in the East Africa Campaign.

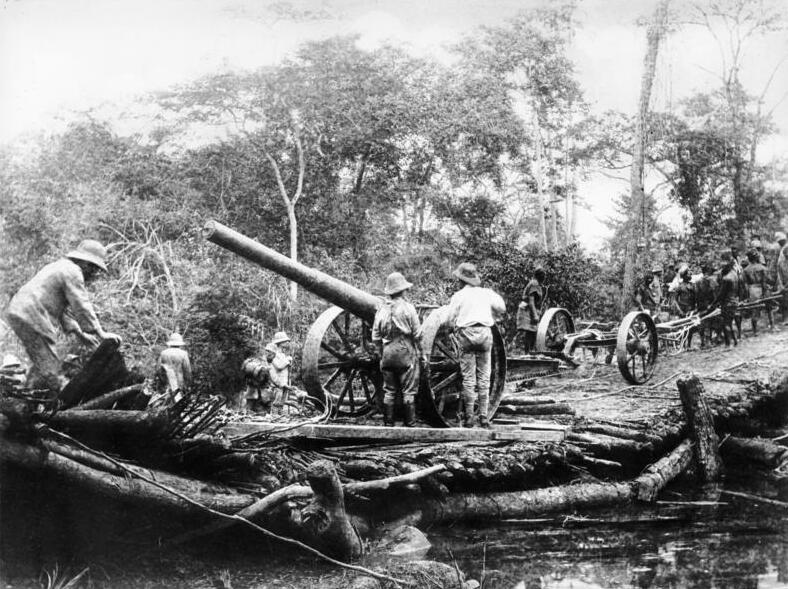
Königsberg gun in the field (1916)

Finally, in April 1915, the British Admiralty agreed to a plan submitted by Drury-Lowe the previous November, which envisioned attacking the German cruiser with shallow-draft monitors, capable of navigating the Rufiji River. Two of the warships, Mersey and Severn, armed with a pair of 6 in (152 mm) guns each, were brought from Britain. Königsberg had in the meantime been moved a third time, even further upriver. The two monitors arrived on 3 June, having been towed from Malta, and put in at Mafia Island for repairs. The island was also used by four newly arrived land-based planes, two Caudron G.3s and two Farman HF.27s. On 6 July 1915, the two monitors crossed the outer sandbar and steamed up the river, despite heavy fire from German positions on the river banks. They stopped at a point they thought to be 10,000 yd (9,100 m) from Königsberg, which would be in range of their own guns but farther than the smaller German guns could reply. Aircraft were used to spot the fall of shot. The monitors' navigation was faulty, however, and after opening fire, they found themselves to be within range of Königsberg's guns. She hit Mersey twice in the engagement; one shell disabled the forward 6-inch gun, and another holed the ship below the waterline. Königsberg was hit four times in return, one shell striking beneath the waterline and causing some flooding. In the span of three hours, Königsberg forced both British ships to withdraw.

They returned again on 11 July, after having repaired the damage sustained in the first attempt. The two monitors conducted a five-hour bombardment, with the fall of shot being corrected by a Farman aircraft. Königsberg opened fire at 12:12, initially with four guns, but only three guns remained in action after 12:42, two guns after 12:44, and one gun after 12:53. The two monitors did not respond until 12:31, once they had been anchored into their firing positions, and scored several serious hits that caused a major fire at the ship's stern and inflicted heavy casualties. By 13:40, Königsberg had run low on ammunition and her gun crews had suffered very heavy casualties, and so Looff ordered the crew to abandon ship and to drop the breech blocks for the guns overboard to disable them. Two torpedo warheads were detonated in the ship's bow to scuttle her; the ship rolled over slightly to starboard and sank up to the upper deck with her flags still flying. Nineteen men had been killed in the battle, with another forty-five wounded, including Looff.

Later that day, the crew returned to haul down the ship's flag and gave three cheers for the Kaiser. The guns and other usable equipment were salvaged from the wreck starting the following day. The guns were converted into field artillery pieces and coastal guns; together with the ship's crew, they went on to see service in the East African land campaign under Lettow-Vorbeck. All ten guns were repaired in Dar es Salaam over the next two months; one was mounted on the converted ferry Götzen of the inland Lake Tanganyika fleet. The surviving sailors, organized as the Königsberg-Abteilung (Königsberg-Detachment), eventually surrendered on 26 November 1917 and were interned in British Egypt. In 1919, after the war, the men took part in a parade through the Brandenburg Gate in Berlin to celebrate their service and that of their ship.

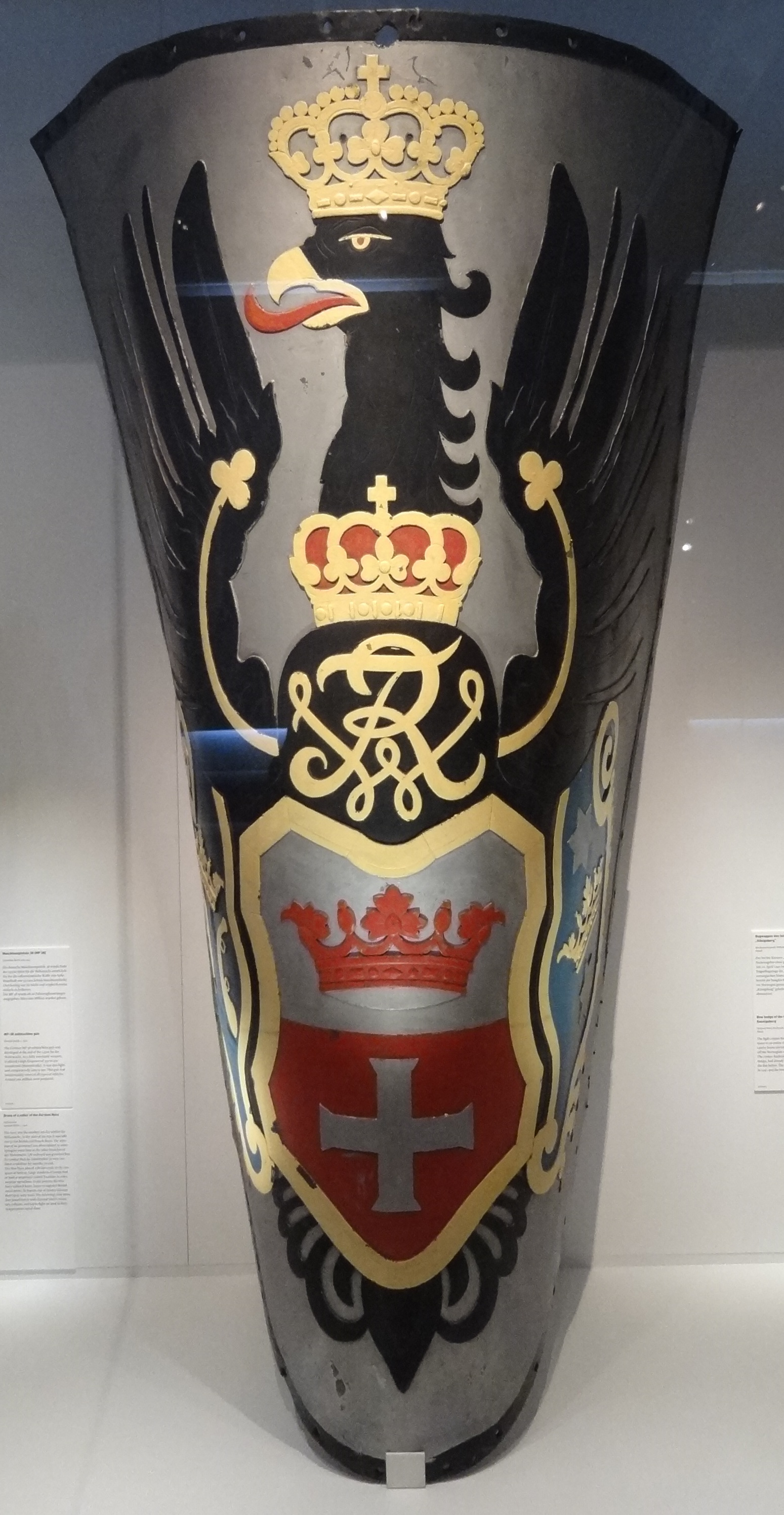
Königsberg bow shield, on display at the Bundeswehr Military History Museum

In 1924, John Ingle, the former captain of Pegasus, was tasked with clearing wrecks from the harbor in Dar es Salaam. At that time, he bought the salvage rights to Königsberg for the price of £200; he sent divers to extract non-ferrous scrap metal from the wreck and in turn sold the rights. Salvage work continued into the 1930s, and by the 1940s the hull had rolled over to her starboard side. As late as 1965, salvage work continued, but in 1966 the wreck collapsed and finally sank into the riverbed. Three of the ship's 10.5 cm guns are preserved, one in Pretoria, South Africa, one in Jinja, Uganda, and one in Mombasa, along with a gun from Pegasus.
