= HMS Astraea (1893) =

Astraea-class cruiser

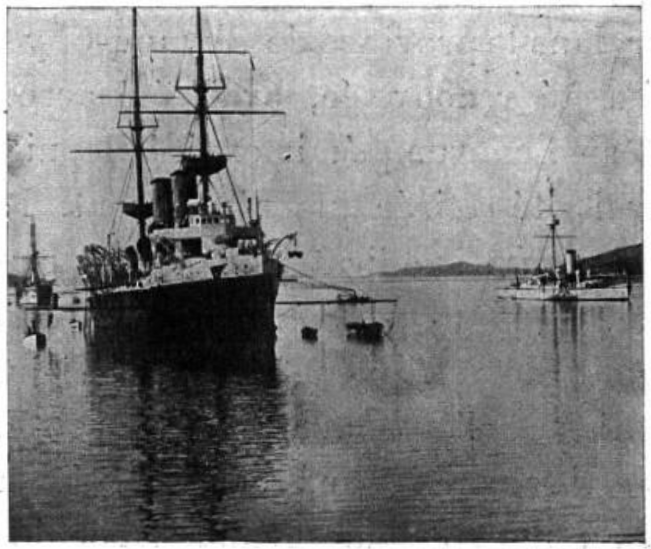
- HMS Astraea

History

United Kingdom
- Name: HMS Astraea
- Builder: Devonport Dockyard
- Laid down: August 1890
- Launched: 17 March 1893
- Commissioned: November 1895
- Fate: Sold on 1 July 1920

General characteristics
- Class & type: Astraea-class cruiser
- Displacement: 4,360 tons
- Length: 320 ft (98 m) (p/p)
- Beam: 49.5 ft (15.1 m)
- Draught: 21 ft 6 in (6.55 m)
- Propulsion: Triple expansion engines; Two shafts; 7,500 ihp
- Speed: 18 knots (33 km/h; 21 mph) (natural draught); 19.5 knots (36.1 km/h; 22.4 mph) (forced draught)
- Range: Carried 1000 tons coal (max)
- Complement: 318
- Armament: 2 × QF 6-inch (152.4 mm) guns; 8 × QF 4.7 in (120 mm) guns; 1 × 76 mm (3.0 in) gun; 2 × 6-pounder guns; 1 × 3-pounder gun; 4 × machine guns; 3 × 18 inch (450 mm) torpedo tubes
- Armour: Conning tower: 3–6 in (76–152 mm); Deck: 2 in (51 mm); Engine hatch: 5 in (130 mm)

HMS Astraea was an Astraea-class second class cruiser of the Royal Navy. She was built towards the end of the nineteenth century, and survived to serve in the First World War.

== Construction and commissioning ==
Astraea was ordered as part of the eight-ship Astraea class under the Naval Defence Act of 1889. She was laid down at Devonport Dockyard in August 1890 and launched from there on 17 March 1893. She was completed and commissioned for service in November 1895.

== Career ==
Astraea served in the Mediterranean Sea in early 1900 under the command of Captain Alfred Paget, and was in China the following year under the command of Captain Casper Joseph Baker. She left Hong Kong on 27 March 1902, homeward bound, arriving in Singapore on 2 April, Colombo on 10 April, Suez on 27 April, Malta on 2 May, and in Plymouth on 14 May, having convoyed the destroyer Skate from the Mediterranean. She paid off at Chatham on 12 June 1902, and was placed in the B Division of the Fleet Reserve, until early the following year she was sent to the London and Glasgow Shipbuilding Company for repairs.

She was again sent to the China Station in 1906, followed by a period at Colombo between 1908 and 1911. She returned to Britain in January 1912, where she was refitted to return to service. She was recommissioned at the Nore in June 1912, and joined the Third Fleet. By April 1913 she had been reassigned to operate off the Cape of Good Hope as part of the squadron assigned to the West Africa Station. She was serving off East Africa at Zanzibar when the First World War broke out, and the squadron was initially assigned to protect British Empire shipping travelling on the trade routes around the African coast. On 8 August 1914 Astraea bombarded Dar-es-Salaam, part of the German colony of German East Africa. Astraea's guns destroyed a radio station, and fearing an imminent landing, the German authorities scuttled their floating dock to block the harbour. This had the subsequent effect of preventing the German commerce raider SMS Königsberg from being able to return to the port. Astraea was later one of the ships assigned to hunt and blockade Königsberg in the Rufiji Delta.

In May 1915 Astraea became the ship of the senior naval officer assigned to support the invasion of Kamerun, replacing the cruiser Challenger in the role.

=== Ghostly encounter ===
One of Astraea's First World War officers was Harold Owen, younger brother of the wartime poet Wilfred Owen. Shortly after the signing of the Armistice, Astraea was anchored in Table Bay. Harold later wrote:

I had gone down to my cabin thinking to write some letters. I drew aside the door curtain and stepped inside and to my amazement I saw Wilfred sitting in my chair. I felt shock run through me with appalling force and with it I could feel the blood draining away from my face. I did not rush towards him but walked jerkily into the cabin—all my limbs stiff and slow to respond. I did not sit down but looking at him I spoke quietly: "Wilfred, how did you get here?"

He did not rise and I saw that he was involuntarily immobile, but his eyes which had never left mine were alive with the familiar look of trying to make me understand; when I spoke his whole face broke into his sweetest and most endearing dark smile. I felt not fear—I had none when I first drew my door curtain and saw him there—only exquisite mental pleasure at thus beholding him. He was in uniform and I remember thinking how out of place the khaki looked amongst the cabin furnishings. With this thought I must have turned my eyes away from him; when I looked back my cabin chair was empty ...

I wondered if I had been dreaming but looking down I saw that I was still standing. Suddenly I felt terribly tired and moving to my bunk I lay down; instantly I went into a deep oblivious sleep. When I woke up I knew with absolute certainty that Wilfred was dead.

Harold only later learned that Wilfred had been killed in action on 4 November 1918, a week before he had apparently appeared to him on Astraea.

== Scrapping ==
Astraea returned to the UK and was paid off in July 1919. She was sold on 1 July 1920 to the ship breakers Castle, but was subsequently resold and was broken up in Germany in 1920.

== Sources ==
- From the Royal Navy log book for HMS Astraea, 22 April 1913. Transcribed by the Old Weather^{[?]} project.
