= Pelorus-class cruiser =

1899 class of British protected cruisers

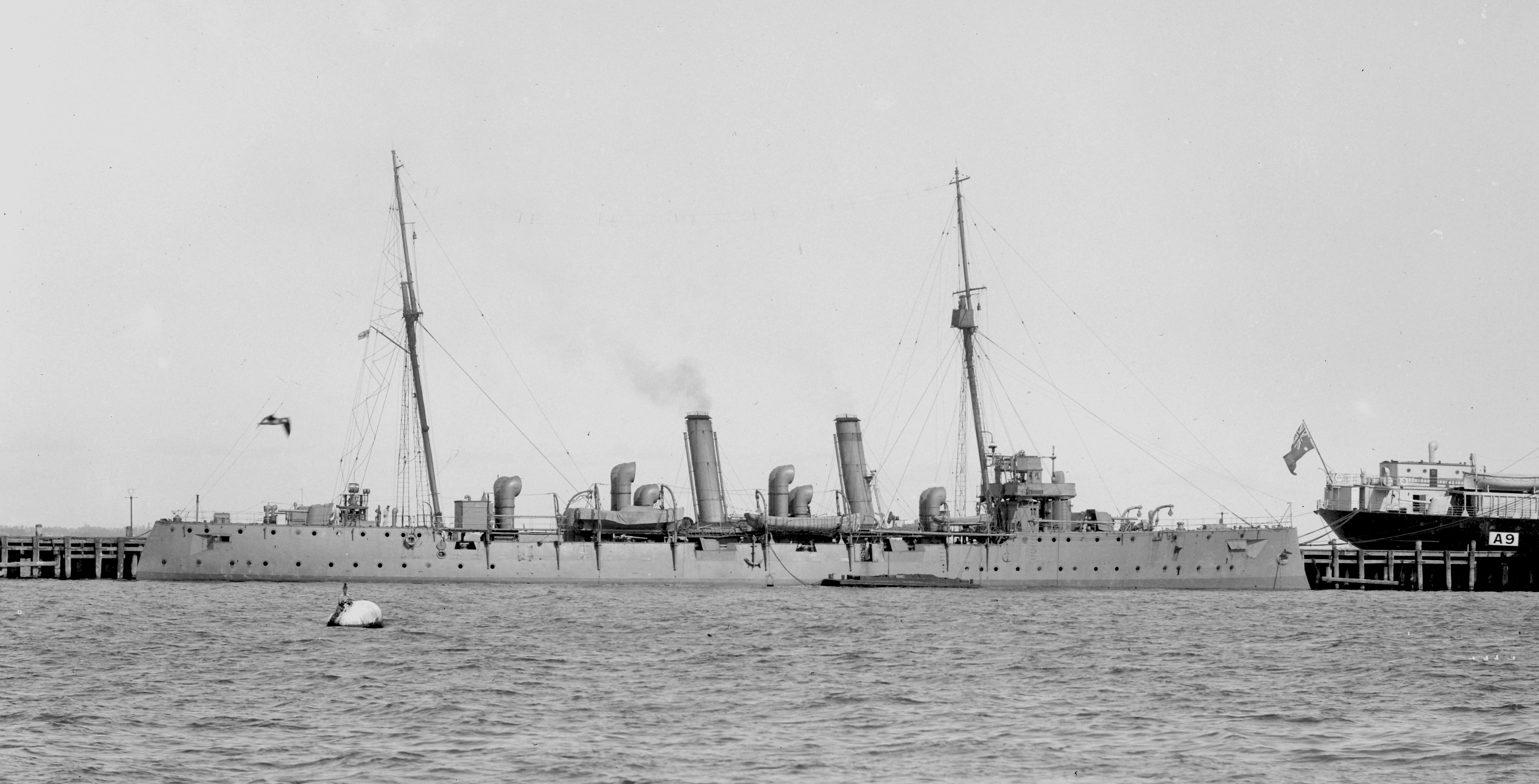
- HMS Pyramus in 1914

Class overview
- Name: Pelorus
- Operators: Royal Navy
- Preceded by: Arrogant class
- Succeeded by: Highflyer class
- Built: 1896–1899
- In commission: 1899–1922
- Completed: 11
- Lost: 1
- Scrapped: 10

General characteristics
- Type: Protected cruiser
- Displacement: 2,135 long tons (2,169 t)
- Length: 300 ft (91.4 m) (p/p, 313 ft 6 in (95.6 m) (o/a)
- Beam: 36 ft 6 in (11.1 m)
- Draught: 17 ft (5.2 m)
- Installed power: 7,000 ihp (5,200 kW)
- Propulsion: 2 shafts, Vertical triple-expansion steam engines; 16 water-tube boilers
- Speed: 20 knots (37 km/h; 23 mph)
- Complement: 224
- Armament: 8 × QF 4-inch (102 mm) guns; 8 × 3-pounder (47 mm) quick firing guns; 2 × 18 inch (450 mm) torpedo tubes
- Armour: Deck: 1.5–2 in (38–51 mm); Conning tower: 3 in (76 mm)

The Pelorus-class cruiser was a "third-class" protected cruiser designed by Sir William White (Director of Naval Construction 1885 – 1902) for the Royal Navy, based on the earlier Pearl-class cruisers. Eleven ships were ordered to this design in 1893 under the Spencer Programme, and were laid down 1896–1900. The first, HMS Pelorus, was commissioned in 1896.

== Development and design ==
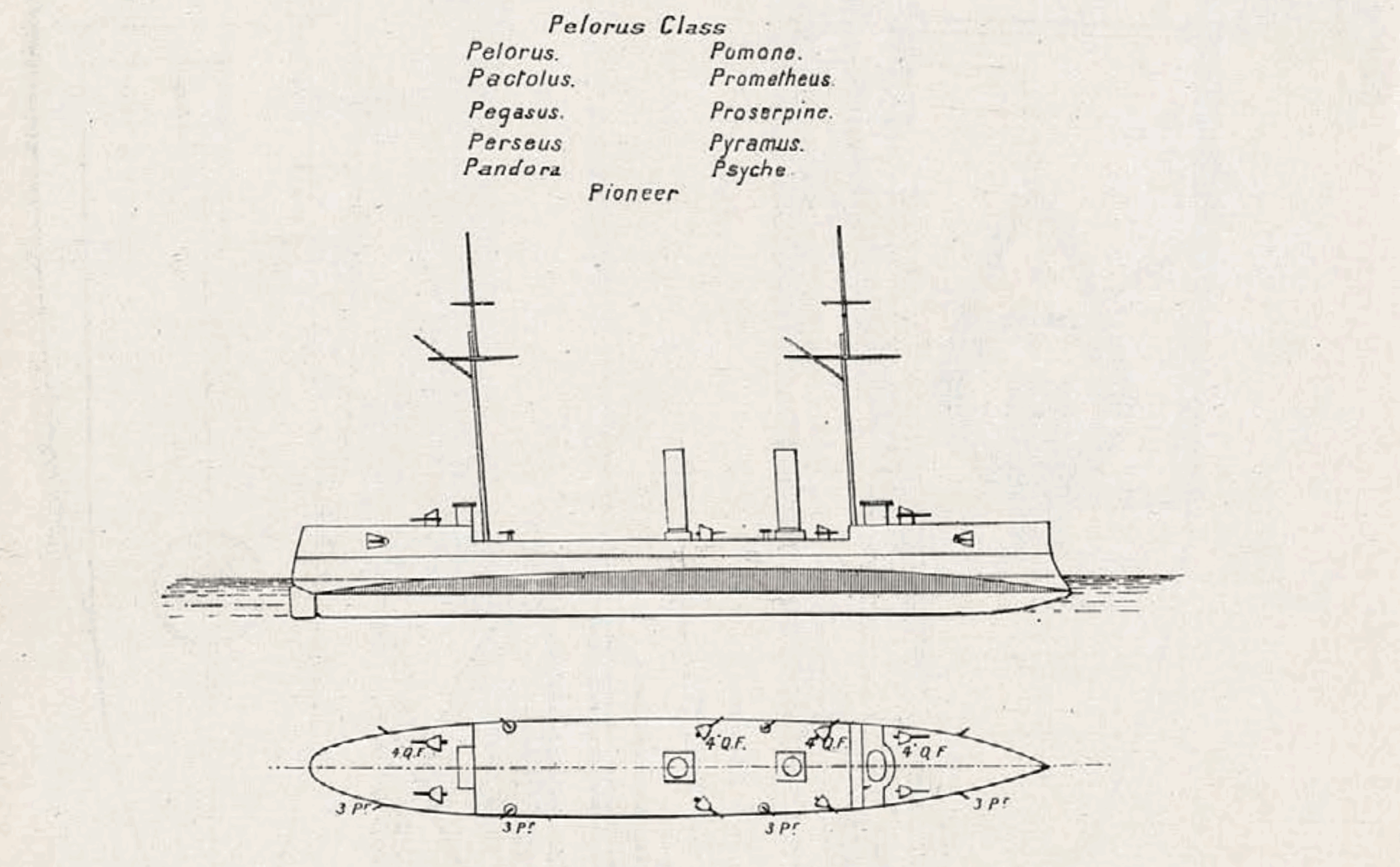
These drawings of the British Pelorus class cruisers were displayed on Plate 12 in Brassey's Naval Annual of 1898.

The Pelorus class ships displaced 2,135 tons and had a top speed of 20 knots (37 km/h; 23 mph). Most served in minor roles on overseas or colonial patrol work, not with the main battlefleets. They carried a complement of 224 and were armed with eight QF 4-inch (25 pounder) guns, eight 3 pounder guns, three machine guns, and two 18-inch (450-mm) torpedo tubes.

They had reciprocating triple expansion steam engines and were equipped with different types of boiler which were trialled in these cruisers. Some had Normand water-tube boilers which could give 7,000 horsepower (5,200 kW) for limited periods of time with forced draught and 5,000 horsepower (3,700 kW) under natural draught.

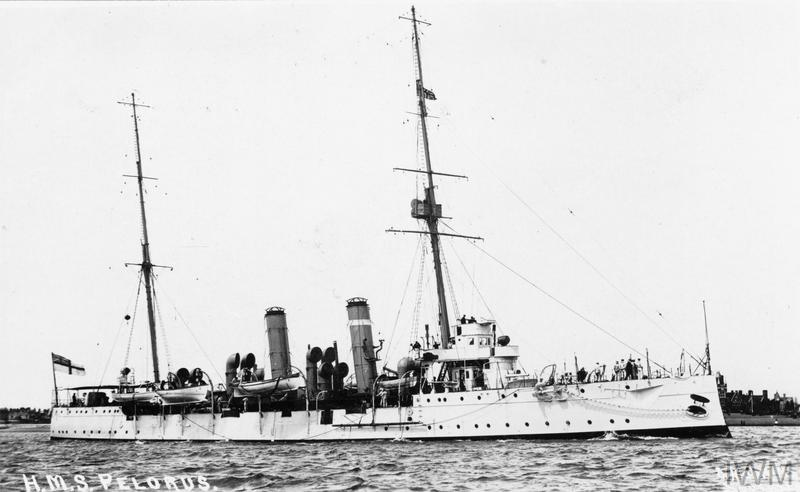
HMS Pelorus, 1910s

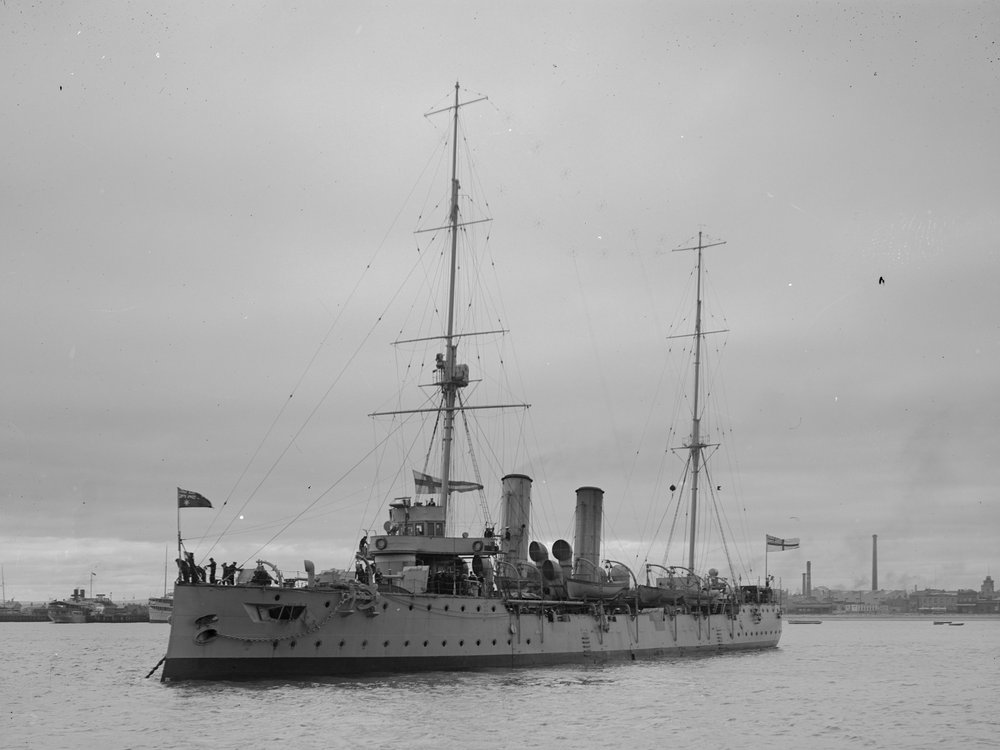
HMAS Pioneer c. 1910s to 1920s

== Ships in the class ==
Name	Launched	Fate
Pactolus	21 December 1896	Sold for scrap on 25 October 1921
Pandora	17 January 1900	Sold for scrap in July 1913
Pegasus	4 March 1897	Sunk 20 September 1914 by SMS Königsberg
Pelorus	15 December 1896	Sold for scrap on 6 May 1920
Perseus	15 July 1897	Sold for scrap on 26 May 1914
Pioneer	28 June 1899	Transferred to Australia on 1 March 1913 although not sold until 1 July 1915. Scuttled on 19 February 1931
Pomone	25 November 1897	Sold for scrap in June 1922
Prometheus	20 October 1898	Sold for scrap on 28 May 1914
Proserpine	5 December 1896	Sold for scrap on 30 November 1919
Psyche	19 July 1898	Sold to Australia 1 July 1915. Sold for scrap in June 1922
Pyramus	15 May 1897	Sold for scrap 21 April 1920

== Service ==
In an era of naval innovation, the class was almost outdated before they were launched. They were fitted with a variety of different boilers as a trial but most were not particularly satisfactory; so HMS Pandora was scrapped in 1913, HMS Perseus and HMS Prometheus in 1914. They had all been condemned in 1904 but had been reprieved. The remainder were to be scrapped in 1915, but were kept in service through the First World War. HMS Pegasus was sunk in combat in 1914, the rest - except for HMS Pioneer - were scrapped between 1919 and 1922. HMS Pactolus and HMS Pomone had Blechynden boilers which were particularly unreliable, they were removed from active service several years before others in the class.

Rear Admiral Cresswell, the 1st Naval Member of the Australian Naval Board described Psyche and Pyramus in 1914 as "the unspeakably useless P. class."
