= QF 4-inch naval gun Mk I – III =

Ordnance QF 4-inch gun Mk I, II, III
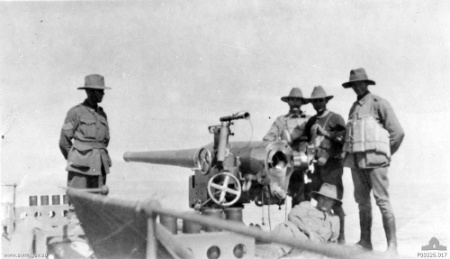
- Australian troops with gun on a transport ship, circa. November 1914
- Type: Naval gun Coast defence gun
- Place of origin: United Kingdom

Service history
- In service: 1896 - 1920 (Note: Remaining ships were all scrapped or decommissioned following WWI, by 1921 at latest)
- Used by: British Empire
- Wars: Boxer Rebellion, World War I

Production history
- Designed: 1895

Specifications
- Mass: 2,912 pounds (1,321 kg) barrel & breech
- Barrel length: 160 inches (4.064 m) bore (40 cal); 165.35 inches (4.200 m) total
- Shell: Separate-loading QF 25 pounds (11.34 kg) Common pointed or Lyddite
- Calibre: 4-inch (101.6 mm)
- Breech: Single-motion screw
- Muzzle velocity: 2,300 feet per second (700 m/s)
- Maximum firing range: 9,000 yards (8,200 m)

The QF 4-inch gun Mks I, II, III (Note: I.e. Mark 1, 2 and 3. Britain used Roman numerals to denote Marks (models) of ordnance until after World War 2. Hence this article describes the first three models of British QF 4-inch guns.) were early British QF (quick-firing) naval guns originating in 1895. They all had barrels of 40 calibres length.

== Naval service ==
The gun was intended to be a more powerful alternative to the quick-firing 3-inch QF 12-pounder gun, and a faster-firing replacement for the BL 4-inch gun.

It was mounted on the following ships:

- Pelorus-class third-class protected cruisers of 1896
- Condor-class sloops of 1898
- Cadmus-class sloops of 1900
- Topaze-class third-class cruisers, launched in 1903
- Invincible-class battlecruisers of 1906

Its 25-pound (11 kg) shell proved insufficiently powerful to make it much of an improvement on the 12-pounder. From 1907 onwards, it was succeeded in its class on new warships by the BL 4 inch gun Mk VIII, which fired a 31-pound (14 kg) shell.

== Coast Defence gun ==
From 1906, a number of Mk III guns were transferred from the Royal Navy for use as coast defence guns around the United Kingdom, and remained until 1939.

In 1918, three guns were in service at Dover Garrison and eight at Forth Garrison.

== World War I land service ==
On 20 September 1914, the British cruiser HMS Pegasus was sunk by SMS Königsberg in Zanzibar harbour. Her eight QF 4-inch Mk III guns were recovered and used ashore in the East African campaign. Some were used as coast defence guns at Zanzibar and Mombasa. Two guns - three from 11 February 1916 - were used by 10th Heavy Battery manned by the Royal Marines, mounted on improvised field carriages and towed by Packard lorries, supported by six REO lorries carrying ammunition.

== Surviving guns ==
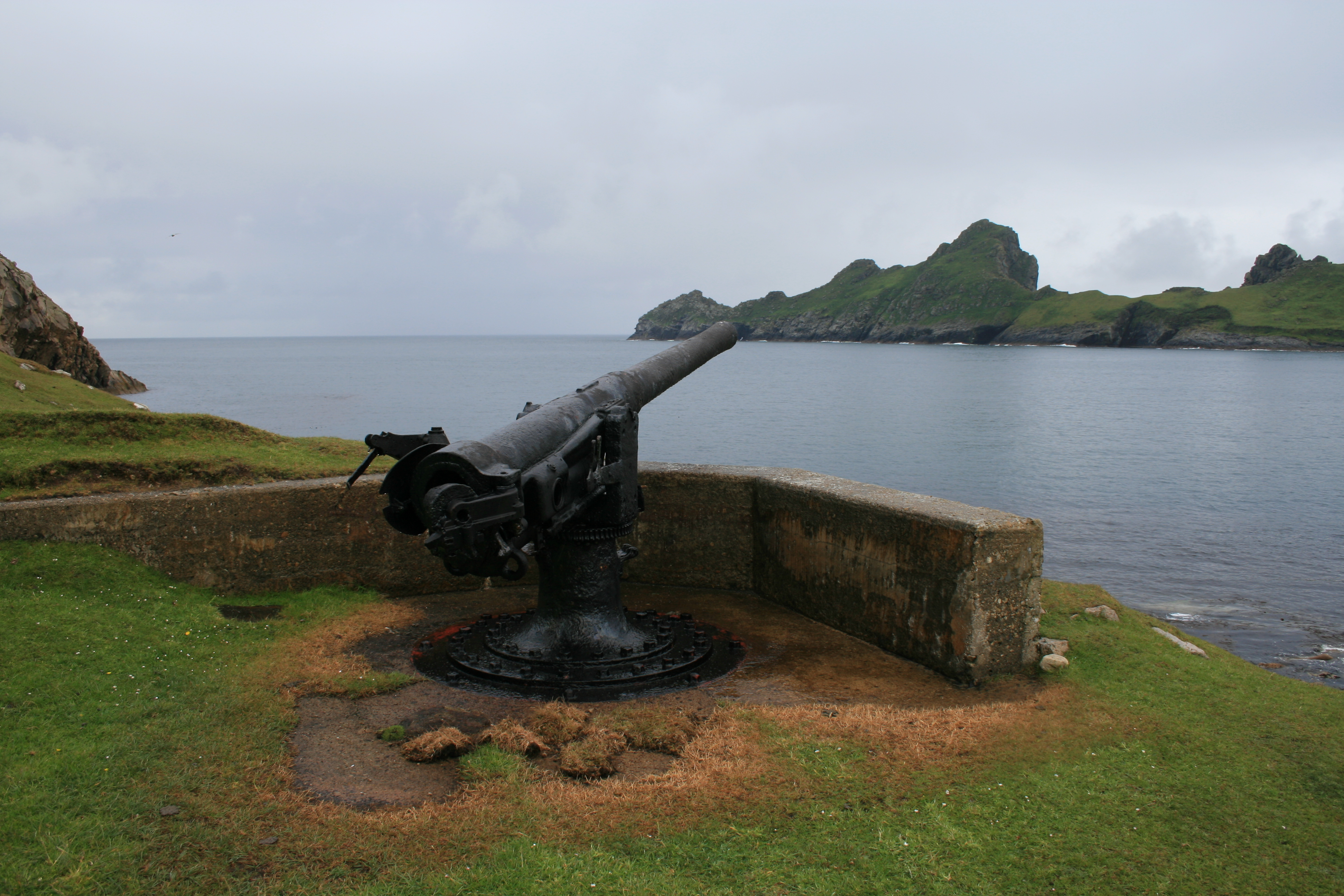
The 4-inch QF gun on Hirta looking towards Dùn

- A gun from HMS Pegasus used in the WWI land campaign stands outside Fort Jesus on Mombasa Island, Kenya, next to one of the 10.5-cm guns from SMS Königsberg.
- A gun from HMAS Protector is on display at the National Military Vehicle Museum in Edinburgh, South Australia.
- A gun was installed in 1918 on the island of Hirta in the St Kilda archipelago, northwest Scotland, after a German submarine attack there, by the German submarine SM U-90.

== See also ==
- List of naval guns

== Bibliography ==
- Text Book of Gunnery, 1902. LONDON : PRINTED FOR HIS MAJESTY'S STATIONERY OFFICE, BY HARRISON AND SONS, ST. MARTIN'S LANE
- General Sir Martin Farndale, History of the Royal Regiment of Artillery : Forgotten Fronts and the Home Base 1914-18. London:The Royal Artillery Institution, 1988
- Hogg, I.V. and Thurston, L.F. (1972). British Artillery Weapons & Ammunition 1914-1918. Ian Allan, London. ISBN 978-0-7110-0381-1.
