= Thistle (disambiguation) =

Thistle is a group of flowering plants.

Thistle may also refer to:

== Places ==
- Thistle, Utah, United States, a ghost town
- Thistle oil field in the North Sea
- Thistle (drug consumption facility), a legal drug consumption facility in Glasgow, Scotland

== Arts, entertainment, and media ==
- Thistle (novel), a 1957 novel by István Fekete
- The Thistle, a Scottish ladies' step dance
- Thistle TV, a defunct local television station in Lanarkshire, United Kingdom

== Businesses ==
- Thistle Hotels
- Thistle Mining, a corporation once headed by David R. Beatty

== People ==
- Thistle Yolette Harris (1902–1990), Australian botanist and conservationist
- Michael Thistle (born 1980), Australian cricketer
- Thomas Thistle (1853–1936), English clergyman and educator

== Sports ==
=== Association football clubs ===
==== Australia ====
- Port Thistle S.C., originally Port Presbyterian Thistle S.C.

==== England ====
- Hereford Thistle F.C.

==== New Zealand ====
- Auckland Thistle
- Christchurch Thistle
- Gisborne Thistle
- Huntly Thistle
- Invercargill Thistle also known as Thistle FC
- Nelson Thistle
- Timaru Thistle

==== Scotland ====
- Ardeer Thistle F.C.
- Armadale Thistle F.C.
- Bathgate Thistle F.C.
- Buckie Thistle F.C.
- Bunillidh Thistle F.C.
- Burghead Thistle F.C.
- Dalkeith Thistle F.C.
- Dalry Thistle F.C.
- East Kilbride Thistle F.C.
- Ferranti Thistle F.C.
- Forres Thistle F.C.
- Inverness Caledonian Thistle F.C.
- Inverness Thistle F.C.
- Kirriemuir Thistle F.C.
- Largs Thistle F.C.
- Larkhall Thistle F.C.
- Lothian Thistle F.C.
- Lugar Boswell Thistle F.C.
- Meadowbank Thistle F.C.
- Partick Thistle F.C.
- Scone Thistle F.C.
- Strathspey Thistle F.C.
- Thistle F.C.
- Wishaw Thistle F.C.

=== Other sports ===
- Thistles (women's cricket), a women's cricket team from South Africa

== Watercraft ==
- Thistle (dinghy)
- Thistle (yacht)
- HMS Thistle, the name of several Royal Navy ships
- USAHS Thistle, a hospital ship
- USS Thistle, the name of several U.S. Navy ships

== Other uses ==
- Thistle (color)
- Thistle tube, a piece of laboratory glassware
- Order of the Thistle, an order of chivalry

== See also ==
- Thistledown (disambiguation)
- Thistleton (disambiguation)
