= Breast Cancer Awareness commemorative coins =

2018 U.S. commemorative coin set

The Breast Cancer Awareness commemorative coins were a series of commemorative coins issued by the United States Mint in 2018 to promote breast cancer awareness. The coins featured a common design from Artistic Infusion Program artist Emily Damstra; it depicts two women on the obverse and a tiger swallowtail butterfly on the reverse. Surcharges on the sale of the coins were given to the Breast Cancer Research Foundation.

The coins consisted of copper-nickel clad half dollars, silver dollars, and gold half eagles. The half eagles coins were the first US coins to be struck in pink gold. Pink gold was used as the color pink is used by the breast cancer awareness movement.

== Legislation ==
New York Representative Carolyn Maloney introduced bill H.R. 2722, the "Breast Cancer Awareness Commemorative Coin Act", to the United States House of Representatives on June 10, 2015, during the 114th United States Congress. The bill required that the United States Mint strike commemorative coins "in recognition of the fight against breast cancer." Maloney had introduced similar legislation during the previous Congress that died in the House. She sought to create a commemorative coin program to raise money for breast cancer awareness "at no cost to taxpayers". During the development of the bill, the United States Mint was asked about the feasibility of striking a coin in pink gold, as the color pink is used by the breast cancer awareness movement. The Mint supported the idea, and the eventual legislation would require that the half eagle be struck in pink gold. The half eagle would be the first US coin to be struck in pink gold.

The House passed H.R. 2722 on July 15, 2015. The Senate passed the bill on April 19, 2016, by unanimous consent. President Barack Obama signed the bill into law (Pub. L. 114–148 (text) (PDF)) on April 29, 2016. The legislation authorized the minting of 750,000 copper-nickel clad half dollars, 400,000 silver dollars and 50,000 pink gold half eagles. The law also required that surcharges be applied to the price of each coin, with the money to be donated to the Breast Cancer Research Foundation (BCRF).

== Design competition ==
The legislation required that a competition be held to select the designs for the coins. The competition would be juried by three members each from the Citizens Coinage Advisory Committee (CCAC) and Commission of Fine Arts (CFA), as well as the Secretary of Treasury. The competition was held in two phases, the first being a selection of up to 20 artists, and the second allowing selected artists to submit design proposals. The Mint began accepting applications for the competition on August 1, 2016. Coin World reported that the selected artists from the first phase would receive $1,000 and the winning artists would each receive $10,000. Numismatic Guaranty Company stated they would also give the winner $10,000 in exchange for hand-signing labels for graded coins.

Committee members from the CCAC and CFA met by teleconference on November 7, 2016, to select artists. Twenty artists were selected, but two were removed later for violating contest rules. A second meeting held in-person on February 15, 2017, to select the winning designs. A ceremony held on October 23, 2017, at the BCRF headquarters in New York City revealed that designs from Artistic Infusion Program artist Emily Damstra for the obverse and reverse of the coins. The ceremony was planned to take place in June, but was moved to October to coincide with Breast Cancer Awareness Month.

== Design ==
The coins were designed by Artistic Infusion Program artist Emily Damstra. The obverse design was sculpted by Mint sculptor-engraver Mint sculptor-engraver Phebe Hemphill. The reverse design was sculpted by Mint sculptor-engraver Mint sculptor-engraver Renata Gordon. The coins shared a common obverse and reverse design.

The obverse of the coins features an older woman and a younger woman. The older woman's face expresses relief as she holds her hands to her chest. The younger woman holds one hand over her chest and raises the other in a fist. A butterfly appears above them. Inscriptions along the rim read LIBERTY, 2018 and IN GOD WE TRUST. When describing the process behind creating the designs on her blog, Damstra said she wanted to depict the people affected by breast cancer and used photographs of her sister and niece as references.

The reverse features a tiger swallowtail butterfly with the legend BREAST CANCER AWARENESS. The remaining inscriptions read UNITED STATES OF AMERICA and E PLUIBUS UNUM, with FIVE DOLLARS, ONE DOLLAR, and HALF DOLLAR on each respective denomination. On her blog, Damstra said she choose a butterfly to symbolize hope, and she picked the tiger swallowtail as the eastern tiger swallowtail and western tiger swallowtail are recognizable across the continental US.

== Striking ==
The half eagle was the first US commemorative coin to be struck in pink gold, which was required by legislation. The Mint began working with its metal suppliers in 2016 to obtain the pink gold needed. The law required that the composition of the half eagle be at least 75% gold. The Mint would develop a composition that was 85% gold, 14.8% copper and 0.2% zinc.

Each coin was struck in proof and uncirculated varieties. The half dollar coins were struck in copper-nickel clad and the dollar coins were struck in 90% silver and 10% copper. The silver dollars were struck at the Philadelphia Mint and the half dollars were struck at the Denver Mint. The pink gold half eagles were struck at the West Point Mint.

A ceremonial striking for the pink gold half eagle was held at the West Point Mint on January 12, 2018, attended by Maloney, representatives from BCRF, and breast cancer survivors.

== Release and reception ==
The coins went on sale on the Mint's website on March 15, 2018. The BCRF heavily promoted the coins to collectors and non-collectors.

Some collectors were disappointed that the pink gold half eagle was not as "pink" as expected, with a few saying the coins they received did not look pink at all.

Donald Scarinci, member of the CCAC, criticized the final design of the coin on his blog, describing the obverse as depicting the women as angry and protesting rather than empowered. Scarinci blamed the design problem on a lack of leadership at the Mint, as most leading positions in the Mint at the time were held by acting officials.

Breast Cancer Awareness commemorative coins sales (as of December 2018)
Sales option	Pre-issue price	Mint and mint mark	Authorized mintage	Total sales	Notes
$5 proof	$431.00	West Point (W)	50,000	10,381	Prices changed weekly due to conditions in the gold market
$5 uncirculated	$421.00	West Point (W)	50,000	4,477	Prices changed weekly due to conditions in the gold market
$1 proof	$51.95	Philadelphia (P)	400,000	34,548	
$1 uncirculated	$48.95	Philadelphia (P)	400,000	12,521	
$.50 proof	$27.95	San Francisco (S)	750,000	17,939	
$.50 uncirculated	$25.95	Denver (D)	750,000	11,301	
Coin and Stamp set	$39.95	Denver (D)	750,000	4,452	Set includes a US Postal Service collectable postage stamp commemorating breast cancer research. Released October 1.
