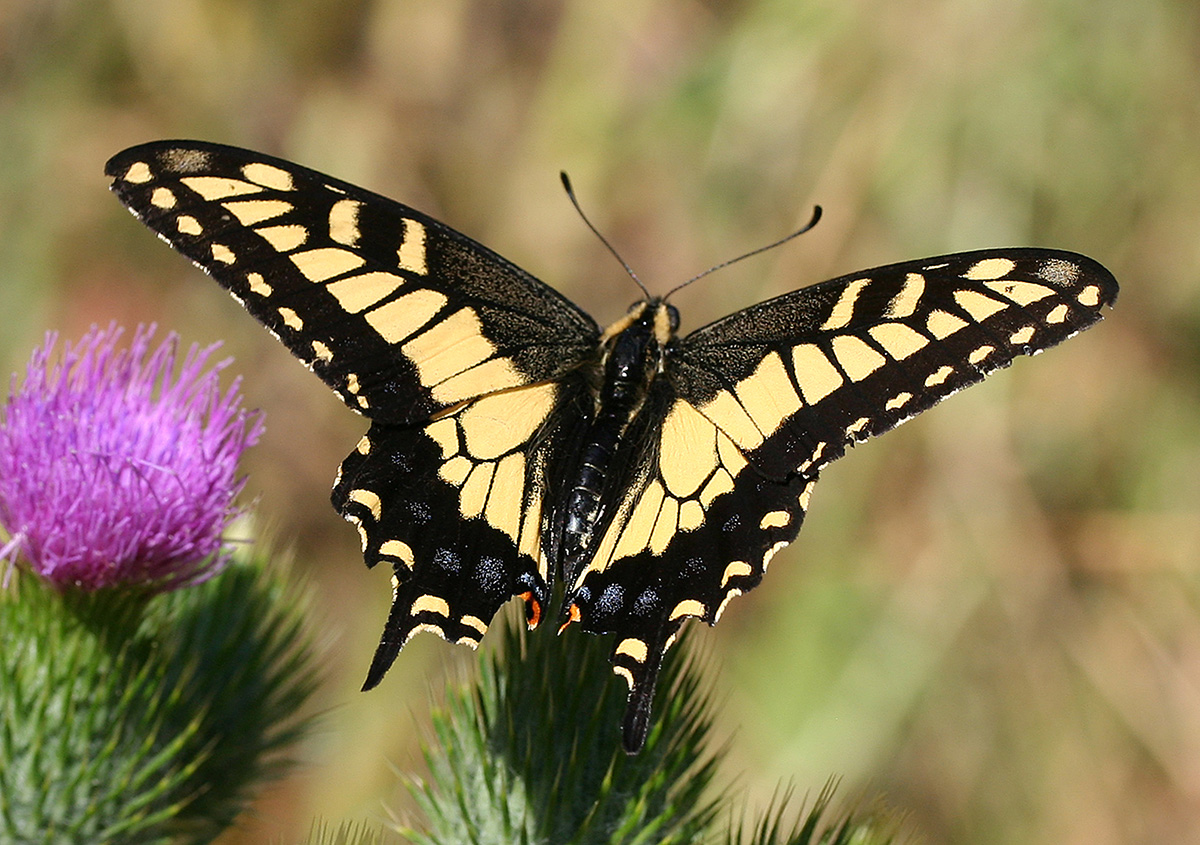

Conservation status
- Secure (NatureServe)

Scientific classification
- Kingdom: Animalia
- Phylum: Arthropoda
- Clade: Pancrustacea
- Class: Insecta
- Order: Lepidoptera
- Family: Papilionidae
- Genus: Papilio
- Species: P. zelicaon

Binomial name
- Papilio zelicaon H. Lucas, 1852

= Papilio zelicaon =

Anise swallowtail

Species of butterfly

Papilio zelicaon, the Anise Swallowtail, is a common swallowtail butterfly of western North America. Both the upper and lower sides of its wings are black, but the upper wing has a broad yellow stripe across it, giving the butterfly an overall yellow appearance. There are striking blue spots on the rear edge of the rear wing, and the characteristic tails of the swallowtails. Its wingspan is 52–80 mm (2.0–3.1 in). Its body is somewhat shorter than the rather similar western tiger swallowtail, with which its range overlaps; it also lacks the black stripes, converging toward the tail, of the latter. There is a somewhat darker subspecies, P. z. nitra, which is rare throughout the range, though somewhat more often found at lower elevations.

== Description ==
The anise swallowtail has a wingspan ranging from 52 to 80 mm (2.0 to 3.1 in). Wings are mostly yellow, with black bands along the edges of both the forewings and hindwings. They are distinguished from tiger swallowtail butterflies by being smaller in size and lacking the vertical black striping patterns. There are yellowish-orange to red eyespots near the tails of each wing, each containing a black pupil. The body is predominantly black, with yellow stripes running laterally along the abdomen.

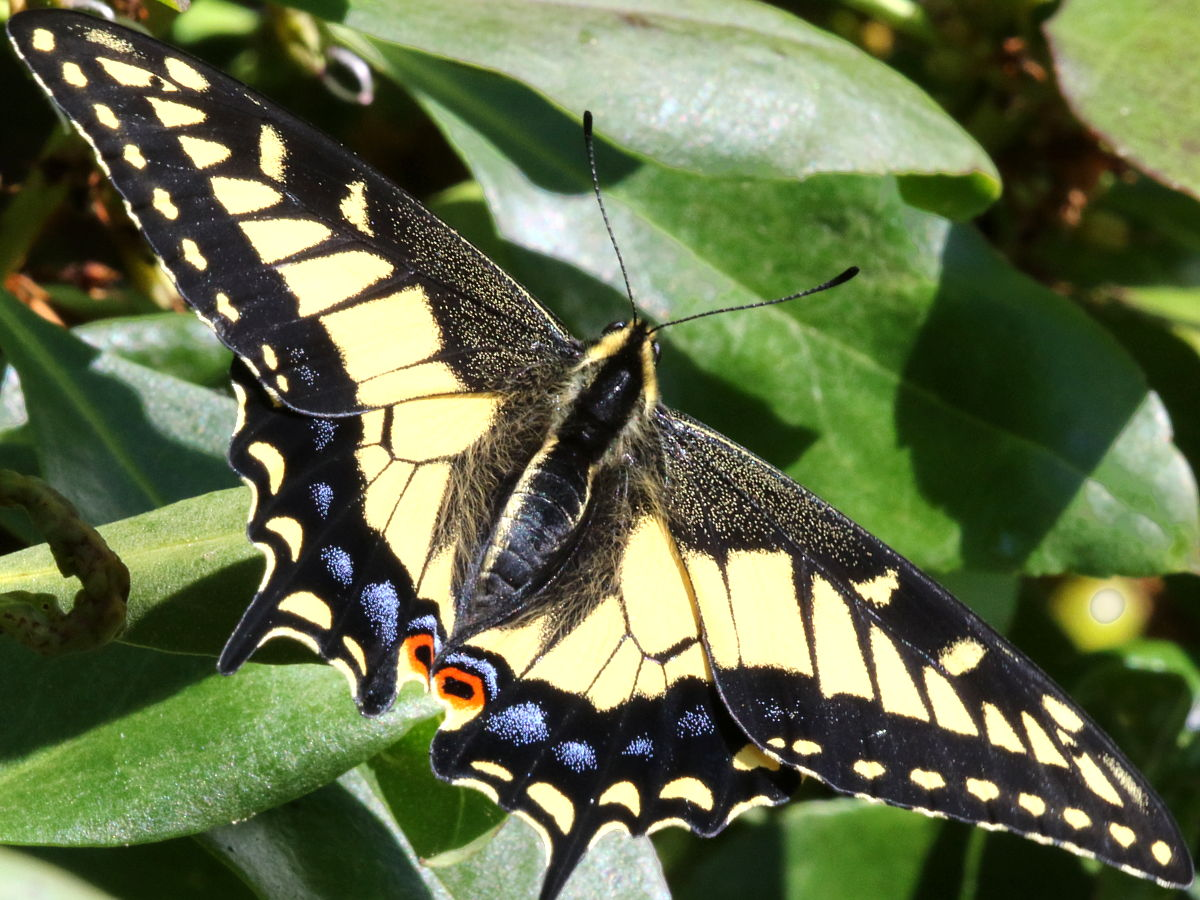
Female

== Distribution ==
The anise swallowtail is a butterfly of fairly open country, and is most likely to be seen on bare hills or mountains, in fields or at the roadside. It is often seen in towns, in gardens or vacant lots.

The usual range of the anise swallowtail extends from British Columbia and North Dakota at its northern extreme, south to the Baja California Peninsula and other parts of Mexico. It is occasionally reported from the southeastern United States, but its normal range does not extend east of New Mexico. In all the more northerly parts of the range, the chrysalis hibernates.

== Life cycle ==
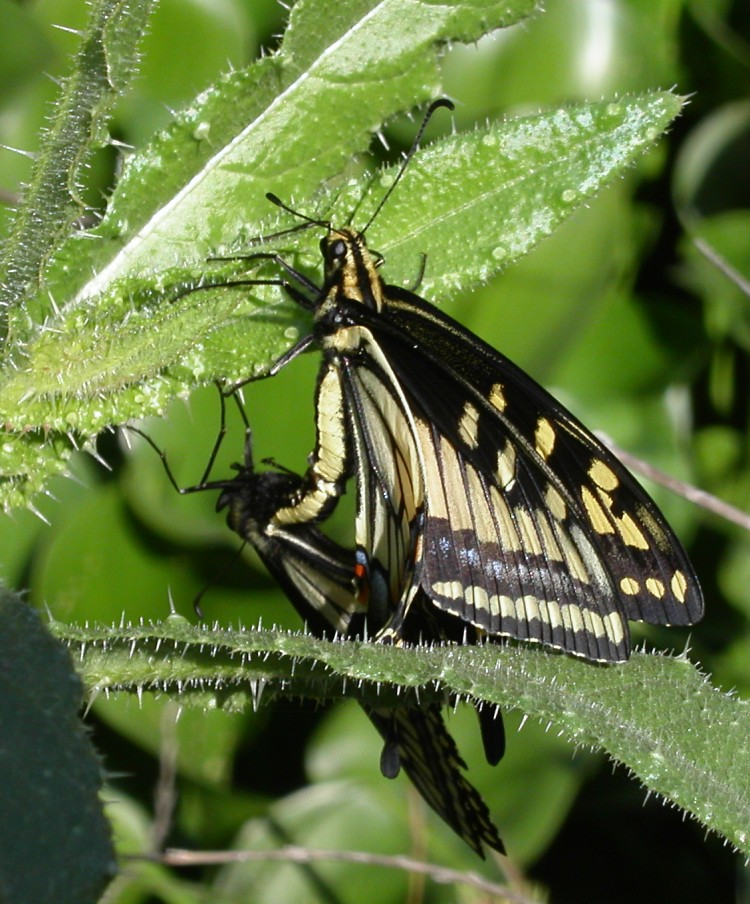
Mating

A European paper wasp interacts with a anise swallowtail caterpillar which uses its osmeterium in defense. Most scenes are repeated in closeup at one-fourth speed.

A spotted towhee finds a anise swallowtail caterpillar to return to its nest and feed to its young.

Adult females lay eggs singly on the undersides of host plant leaves. In the first two instars, the caterpillar is dark brown, almost black, with an irregular white band at its middle. After that, it becomes more green at each successive molt until, in the fifth (last) instar, it is predominantly green, with markings in black, orange, and light blue. Its major food plants are members of the carrot family, Apiaceae (including fennel), and also some members of the citrus family, Rutaceae. Like all swallowtail caterpillars, if disturbed, it will suddenly evert bright orange osmeteria (or "stinkhorns") from just behind its head, glandular structures which give off a foul odor. The caterpillar grows to around 5 cm in length before forming a chrysalis, which is brown or green and about 3 cm long.

The anise swallowtail pupa looks like a thick branch coming off of the larval host plant. The top of the pupa extends slightly from the plant, held by strong silk. This is where the adult butterfly emerges.
