= Sir James Clark, 1st Baronet =

Scottish physician (1788–1870)

Sir James Clark Bt KCB
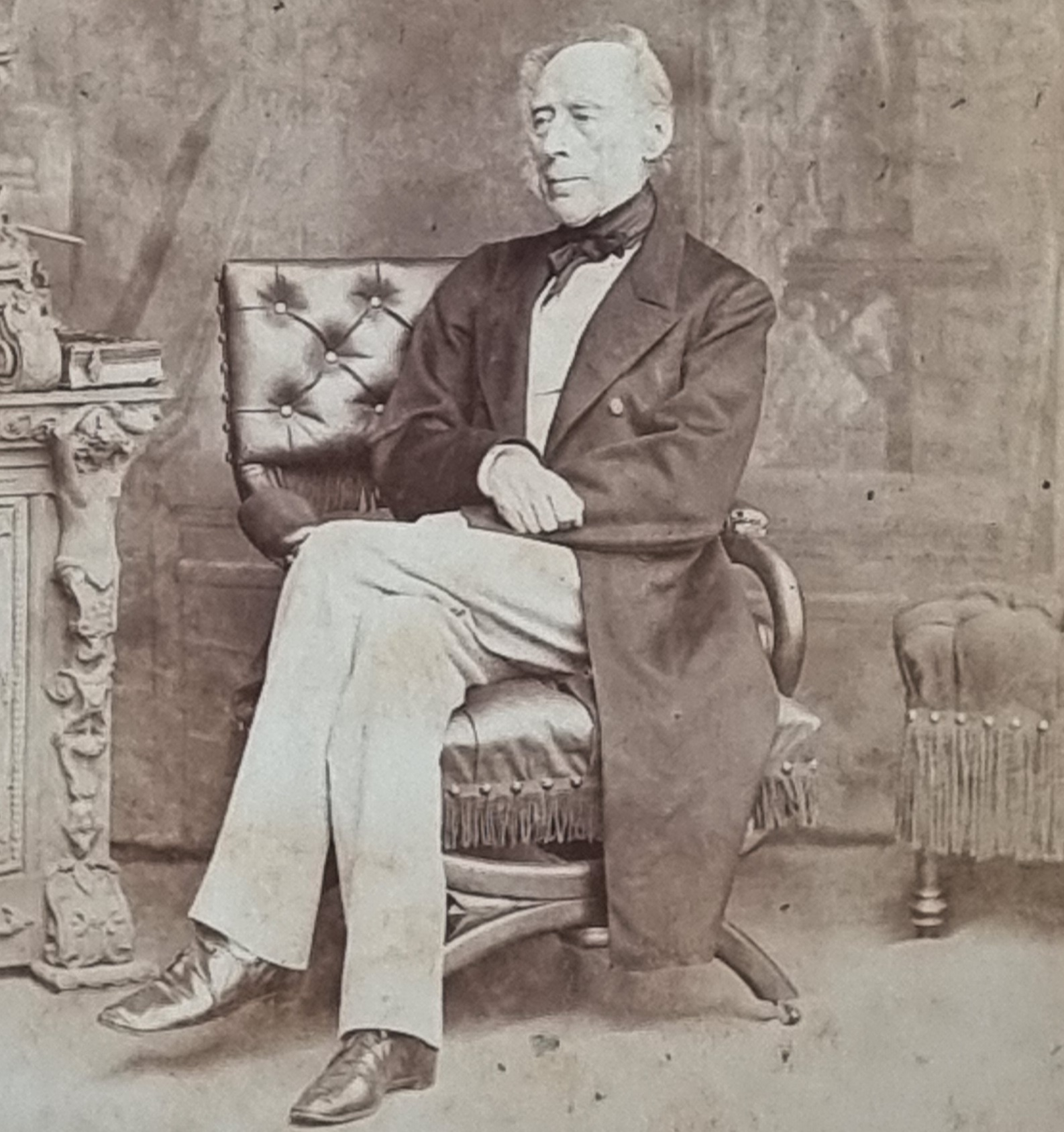
- James Clark, c. 1863
- Born: 14 December 1788; Cullen, Banffshire, Scotland
- Died: 29 June 1870 (aged 81); Bagshot Park, Surrey, England
- Spouse: Barbara Stephen
- Children: 1

Sir James Clark, 1st Baronet, KCB (14 December 1788 – 29 June 1870) was a Scottish physician who was Physician-in-Ordinary to Queen Victoria between 1837 and 1860, and was previously physician to poet John Keats in Rome.

== Early life and career ==
Clark was born in Cullen, Banffshire, Scotland, and was educated at Fordyce School. He studied at Aberdeen University, where he took an arts degree intending to study law, and graduated as a M.A., before discovering a preference for medicine. He then went to Edinburgh University, and in 1809 became a member of the Royal College of Surgeons of Edinburgh.

He then entered the medical service of the Royal Navy. He served at the Royal Hospital Haslar, in Hampshire, until July 1810, when he was appointed assistant surgeon aboard HMS Thistle. After the ship was wrecked in 1811 south of Sandy Hook in New Jersey, he returned to Great Britain, where he was promoted to the rank of a surgeon and served successively on HMS Colobrée, which was also wrecked, as well as on Chesapeake and Maidstone.

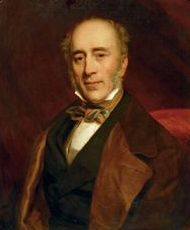
Sir-James-Clark-1788-1870

Following the end of the Napoleonic Wars in 1815, he continued his studies in Edinburgh, where he graduated in 1817 with an MD. In 1818, he travelled to the south of France and Switzerland with a gentleman who had phthisis (tuberculosis). He began collecting meteorological and other data and noted the effects of changes in climate on the disease.

He settled in Rome in 1819, and developed a medical practice there, with steadily increasing reputation and pecuniary success. One of his patients was the poet John Keats, who arrived in Rome in November 1820. Clark thought that "mental exertions and application" were "the sources of his complaints", which he believed were "situated in his Stomach". When he finally diagnosed consumption, he put Keats on a starvation diet of an anchovy and a piece of bread a day, to cut the flow of blood to his stomach. He also regularly drew blood from him, and took away Keats's supply of laudanum for fear that he would take a deliberate overdose. It has been suggested in recent years that Clark's treatment of Keats contributed to the poet's agonising death from tuberculosis in February 1821.

In 1822, while in Rome, Clark published Medical Notes on Climate, Diseases, Hospitals, and Medical Schools in France, Italy, and Switzerland, comprising an Inquiry into the Effects of a Residence in the South of Europe in Cases of Pulmonary Consumption. He also made contact with members of the European royal families and aristocracy, among them Prince Leopold, later King of the Belgians, as well as English aristocrats travelling in Europe. At Carlsbad (now Karlovy Vary), Prince Leopold found Clark examining the waters and was struck with the desire to learn their uses. On his return to England, he appointed Clark as his physician.

Clark returned to London in 1826 and was admitted as a Licentiate of the College of Physicians and appointed physician to St George's Infirmary. He steadily built up a medical practice in London, and in 1829 published what was described as his "best and most important work", The Influence of Climate in the Prevention and Cure of Chronic Diseases, more particularly of the Chest and Digestive Organs. In it, he systematised and popularised all that was known about the subject, and gave a more correct view of the powers of climate and mineral waters in the treatment of disease than had hitherto existed in the English language. The book established his reputation in London and with the members of his profession. He promoted the use of mineral waters to treat disease and became both famous and popular for the care he took in his prescriptions. He thought it "not beneath his notice or his dignity to study the art of prescribing practically, and by repeated trials, and his prescriptions compared favourably with those of most of his contemporaries." He was elected Fellow of the Royal Society in 1832.

== Physician to Queen Victoria ==
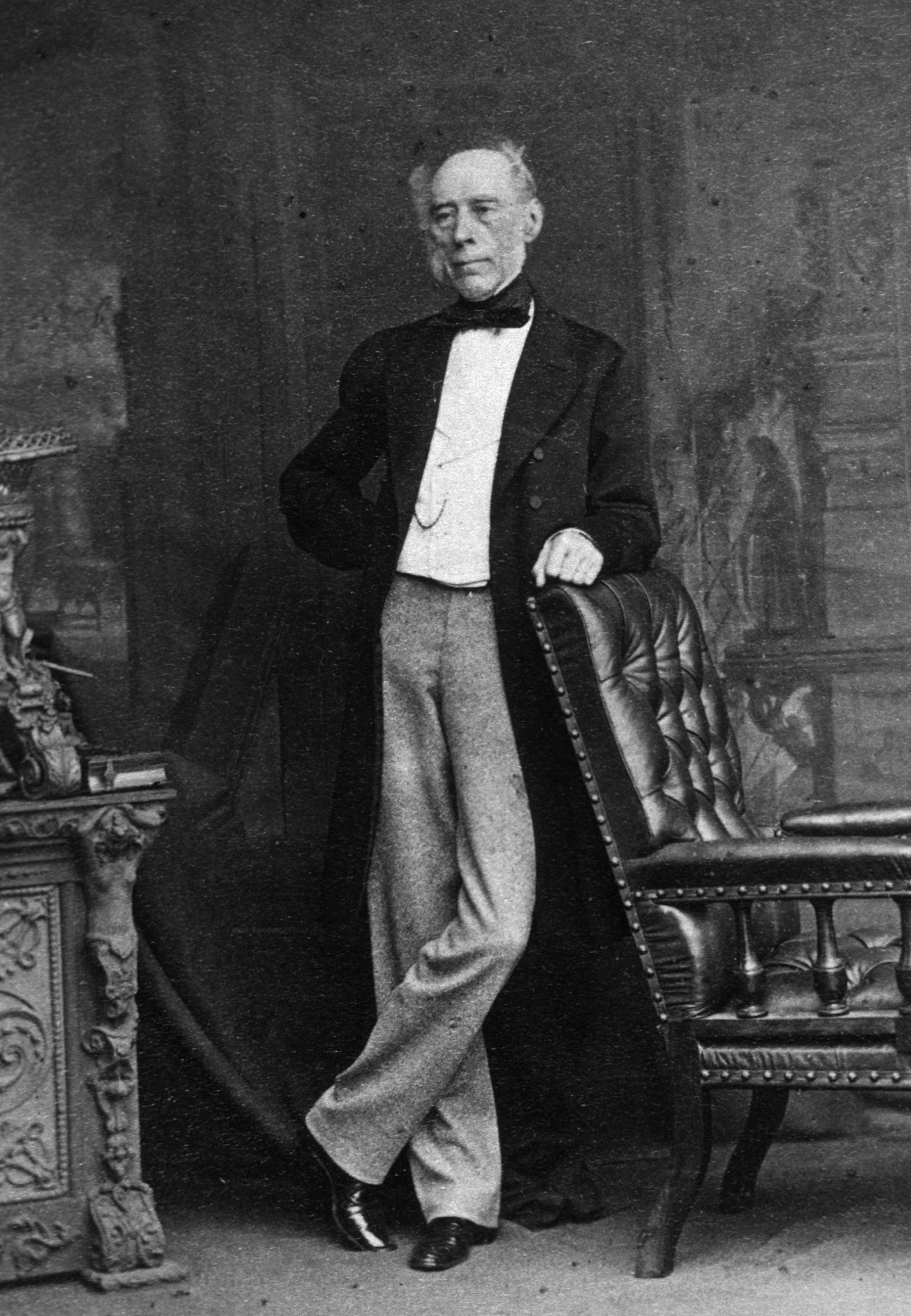
A photograph of James Clark

In 1834, King Leopold recommended Clark as court physician to his widowed sister, the Duchess of Kent, and her daughter, Princess Victoria. King Leopold made him a knight in his order of Leopold in 1834 and a commander in 1850. This appointment led to a large increase in his business and reputation. He published his Treatise on Pulmonary Consumption, comprehending an Inquiry into the Causes, Nature, Prevention, and Treatment of Tuberculous and Scrofulous Diseases in general, in eight volumes in 1835. On 11 November 1837, sixth months after Victoria's accession to the throne, Clark was appointed the Queen's Physician-in-Ordinary, and was created baronet of St George's Hanover Square, London.

His popularity was undermined by scandal when, in January 1839, he was asked to diagnose an abdominal swelling of the unmarried Lady Flora Hastings. Clark said that he could not diagnose her condition without an examination, which Lady Flora initially refused; however, Clark assumed that the swelling was a pregnancy. Lady Flora's enemies, Baroness Louise Lehzen and the Marchioness of Tavistock then spread the rumour that she was pregnant, and the Queen wrote in her journal that she suspected that John Conroy, a man she loathed intensely, was the father. It was assumed by the public at the time that Clark had "given support to a slander against [Lady Flora]'s character by sharing suspicions which his medical knowledge should have dissipated." When Lady Flora finally consented to an examination, it was discovered that she was not pregnant but had an advanced, cancerous liver tumour, from which she died a few months later. Conroy and her brother, Lord Hastings, stirred up a press campaign against both the Queen and Clark which attacked them for insulting and disgracing Lady Flora with false rumours, and for plotting against her and her family. The effect upon his practice was immediate; it was years before it passed off, and was never wholly obliterated.

In 1840 Clark was also appointed physician to Prince Albert, and he became a trusted advisor to the royal family on all medical matters. Reportedly, "he gradually became most unwittingly a power in the State. Always about the Court, high in the favour of the sovereign, and known to be greatly esteemed by the prince consort, he became the person to whom statesmen constantly referred for advice connected with medical matters and polity. He was always ready with advice, with suggestion, and wise, carefully-considered counsel." He served on several Royal Commissions, and on the Senate of the University of London from 1838. He was credited with developing the medical section of the university. Clark also played an influential role in establishing the Royal College of Chemistry in 1845, and served on the General Medical Council from 1858 to 1860.

In 1866 he was appointed a Knight Commander of the Order of the Bath (KCB).

== Retirement and death ==
He began a process of gradual retirement in 1860, and moved to Bagshot Park, Surrey, which the Queen had lent him for life. His wife, Barbara Stephen, known as Minnie, whom he had married in 1820, died in 1862. They had one son, John Forbes Clark. Sir James Clark died at Bagshot Park in 1870, aged 81, and was buried at Kensal Green.

Baronetage of the United Kingdom
New creation	Baronet (of St George's Hanover Square); 1837–1870	Succeeded by John Forbes Clark
