= Thistle =

Common name of a group of flowering plants

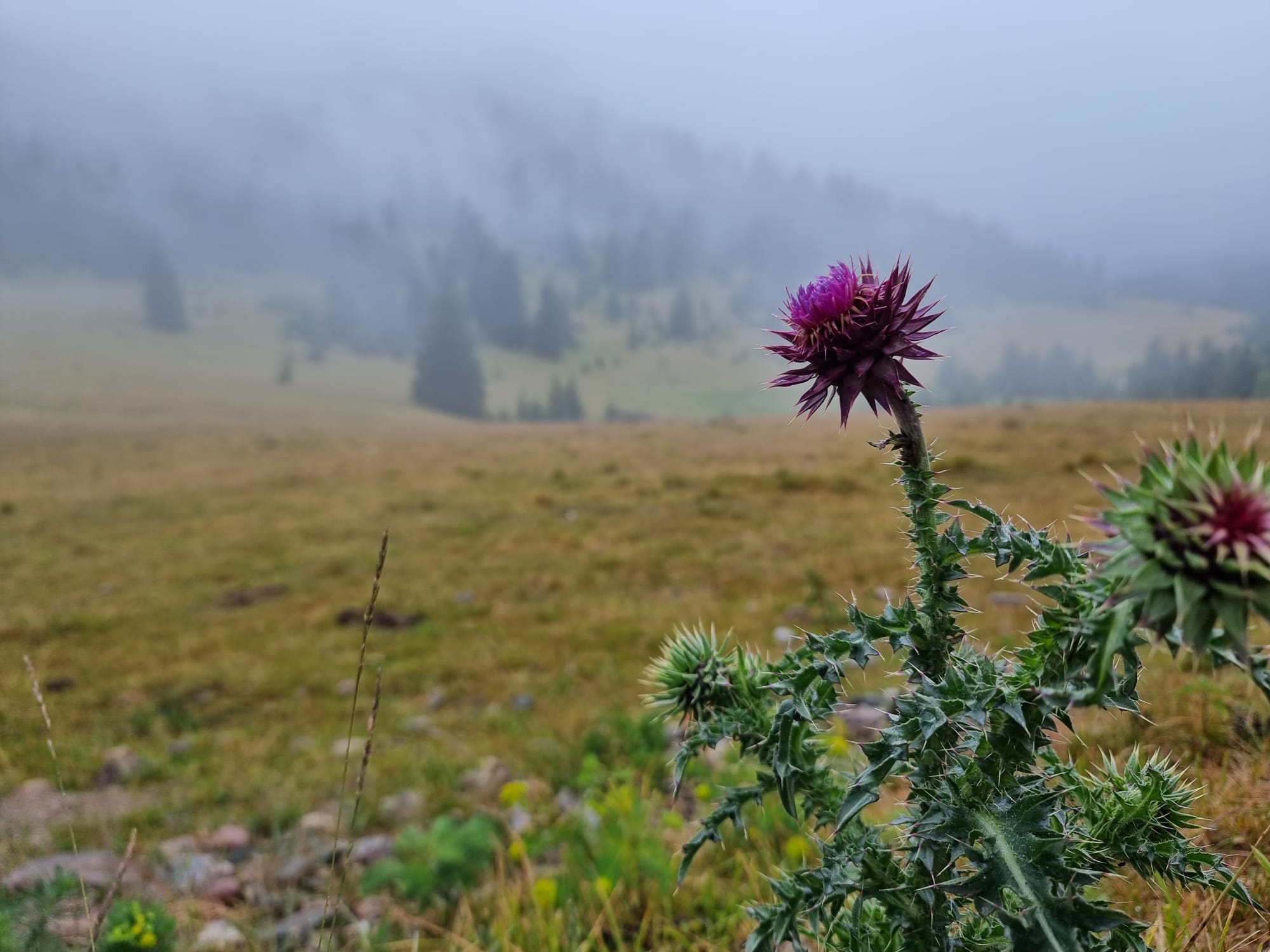
Musk thistle, C. nutans in the Carpathian Mountains

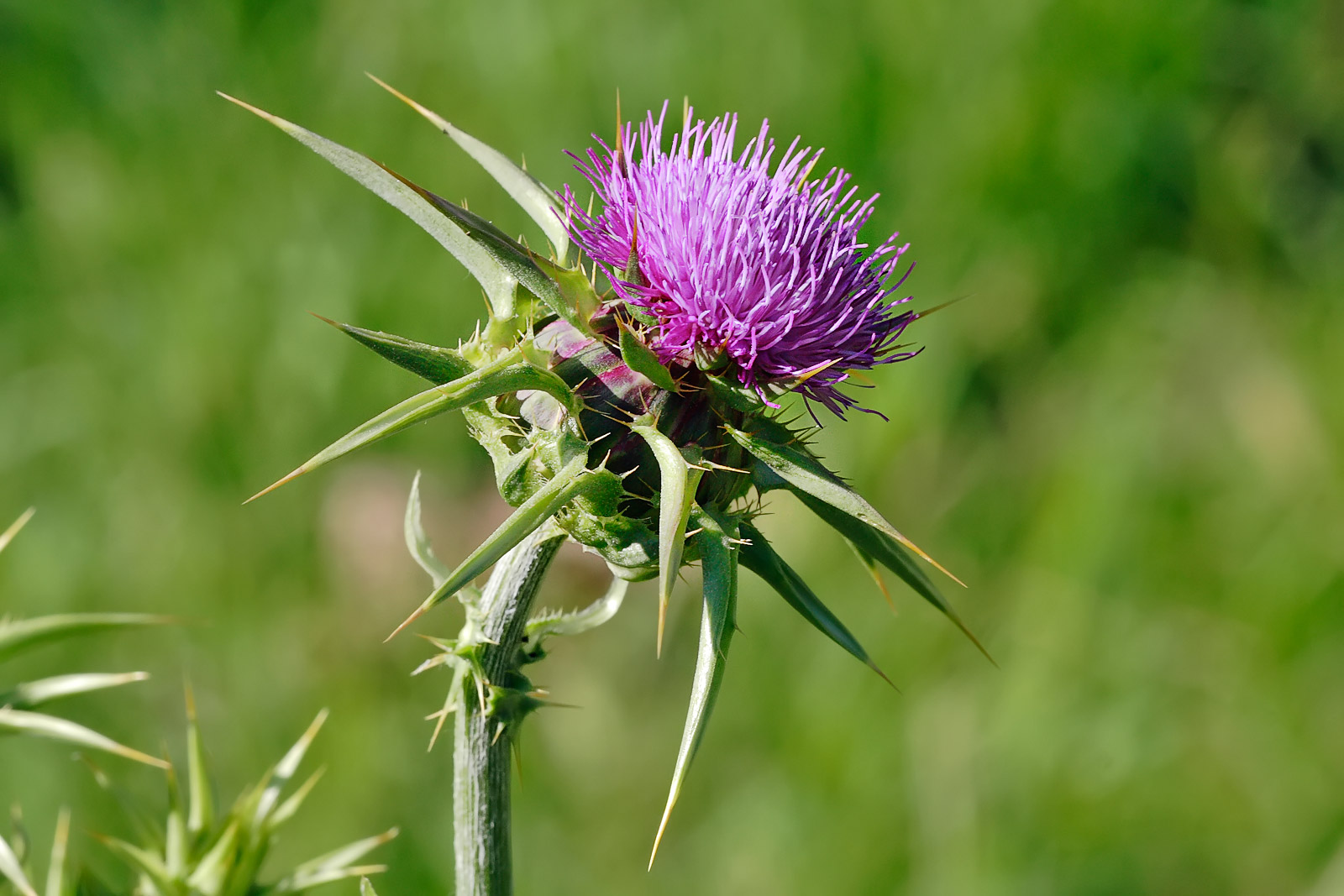
Milk thistle flowerhead

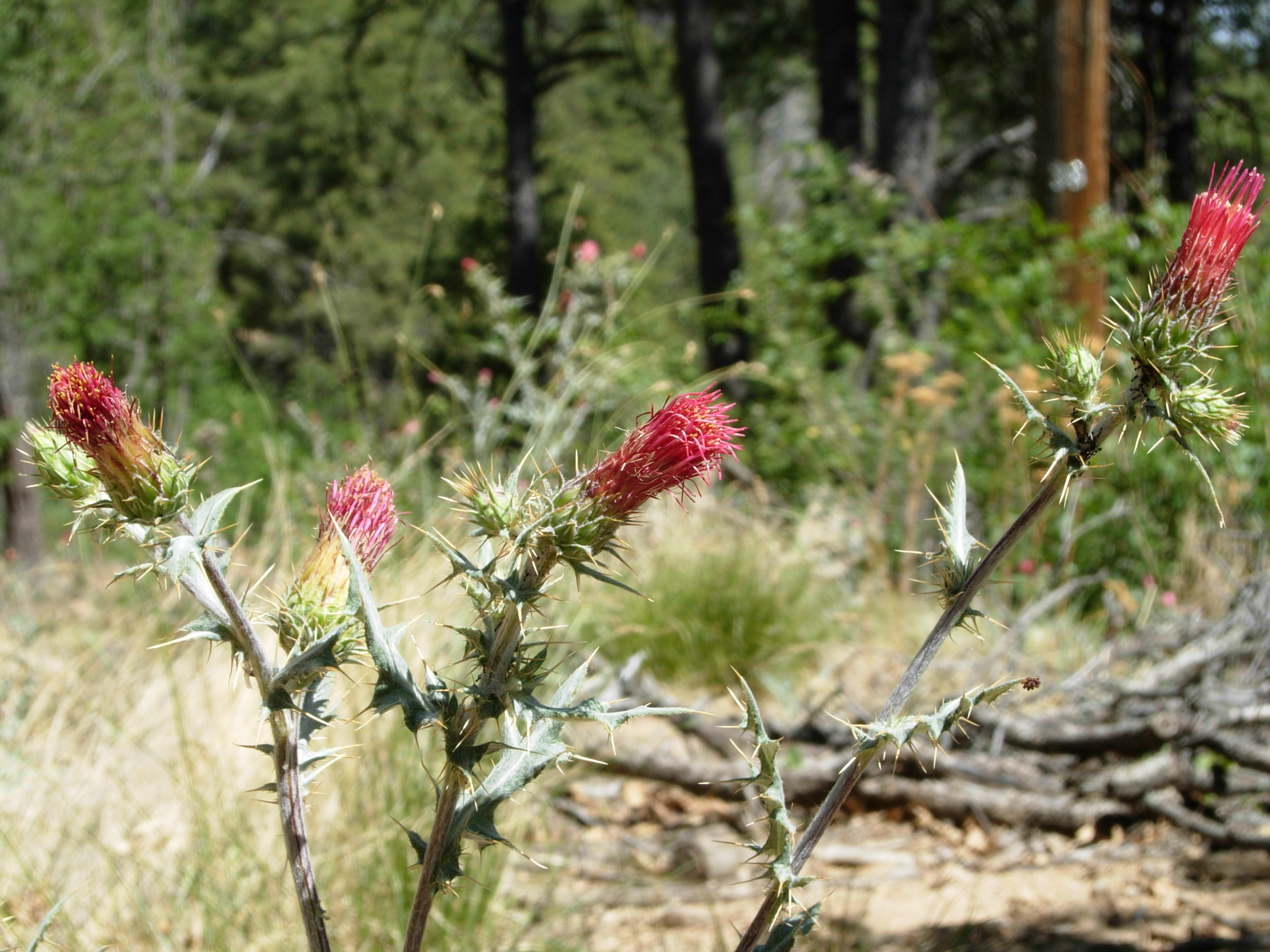
Cirsium arizonicum, showing arachnoid cobwebbiness on stems and leaves, with ants attending aphids that might be taking advantage of the shelter.

Thistle is the popular name of a group of flowering plants characterised by leaves with sharp spikes on the margins, mostly in the family Asteraceae. Prickles can also occur all over the plant – on the stem, and on the flat parts of the leaves. These prickles protect the plant from herbivores. Typically, an involucre with a clasping shape, similar to a cup or urn, subtends each of a thistle's flower heads. The typically feathery pappus of a ripe thistle flower is known as thistle-down.

The spines vary considerably by species. For example, Cirsium heterophyllum has very soft spines, while Cirsium spinosissimum is the opposite. Typically, species adapted to dry environments are more spiny.

The term "thistle" is sometimes taken to mean precisely those plants in the tribe Cardueae (synonym: Cynareae), especially the genera Carduus, Cirsium, and Onopordum. However, plants outside this tribe are sometimes also called thistles.

Biennial thistles are particularly noteworthy for their high wildlife value, producing copious floral resources for pollinators, nourishing seeds for birds like the goldfinch, foliage for butterfly larvae, and down for the lining of birds' nests.

A thistle is the floral emblem of Scotland and Lorraine, as well as the emblem of the Encyclopædia Britannica.

== Taxonomy ==
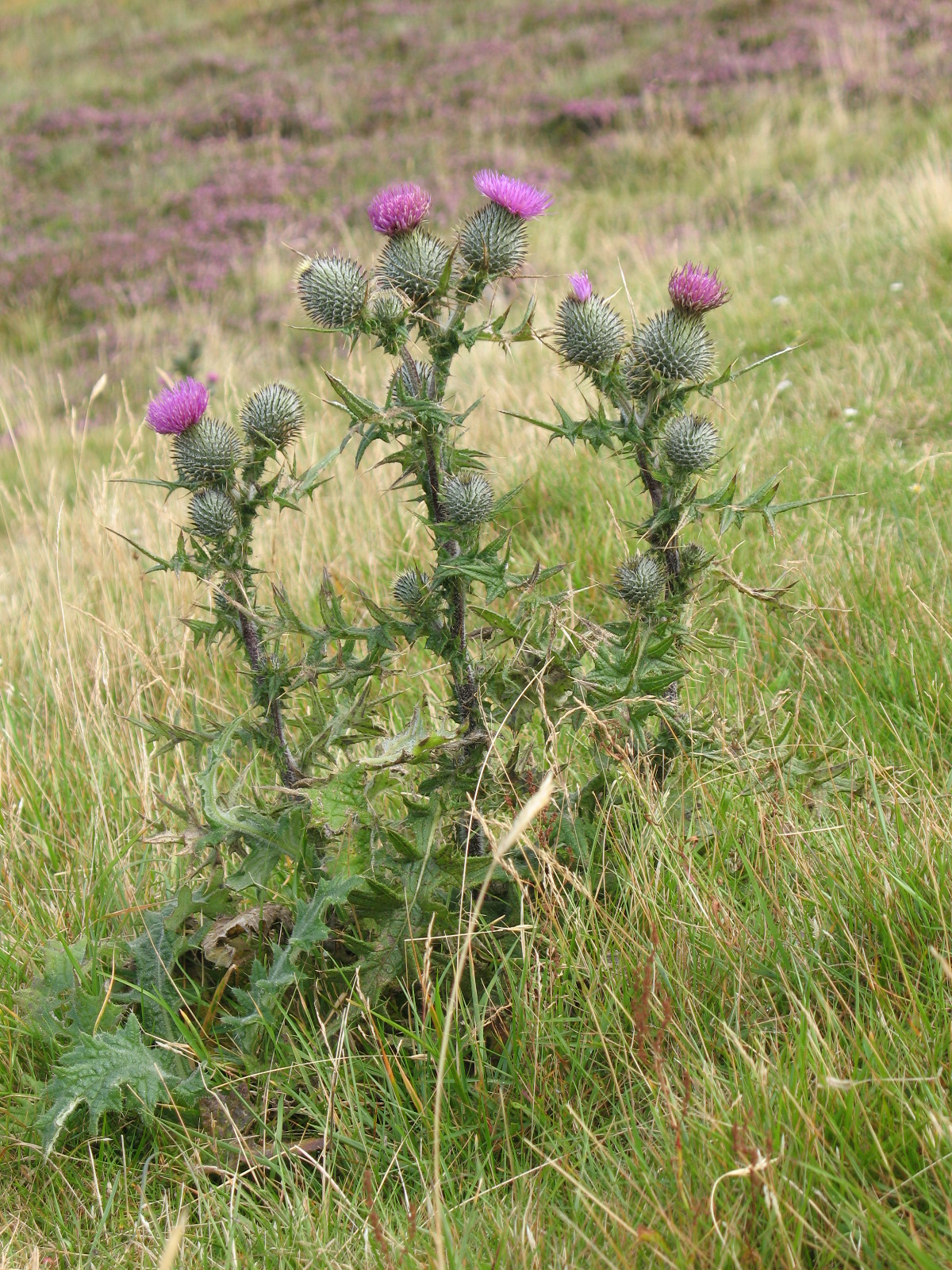
Spear Thistle Cirsium vulgare in Scotland, 2007

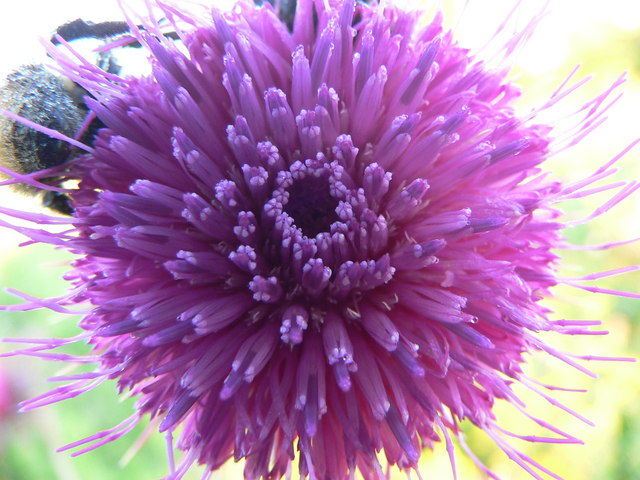
Carduus nutans in the early morning light.

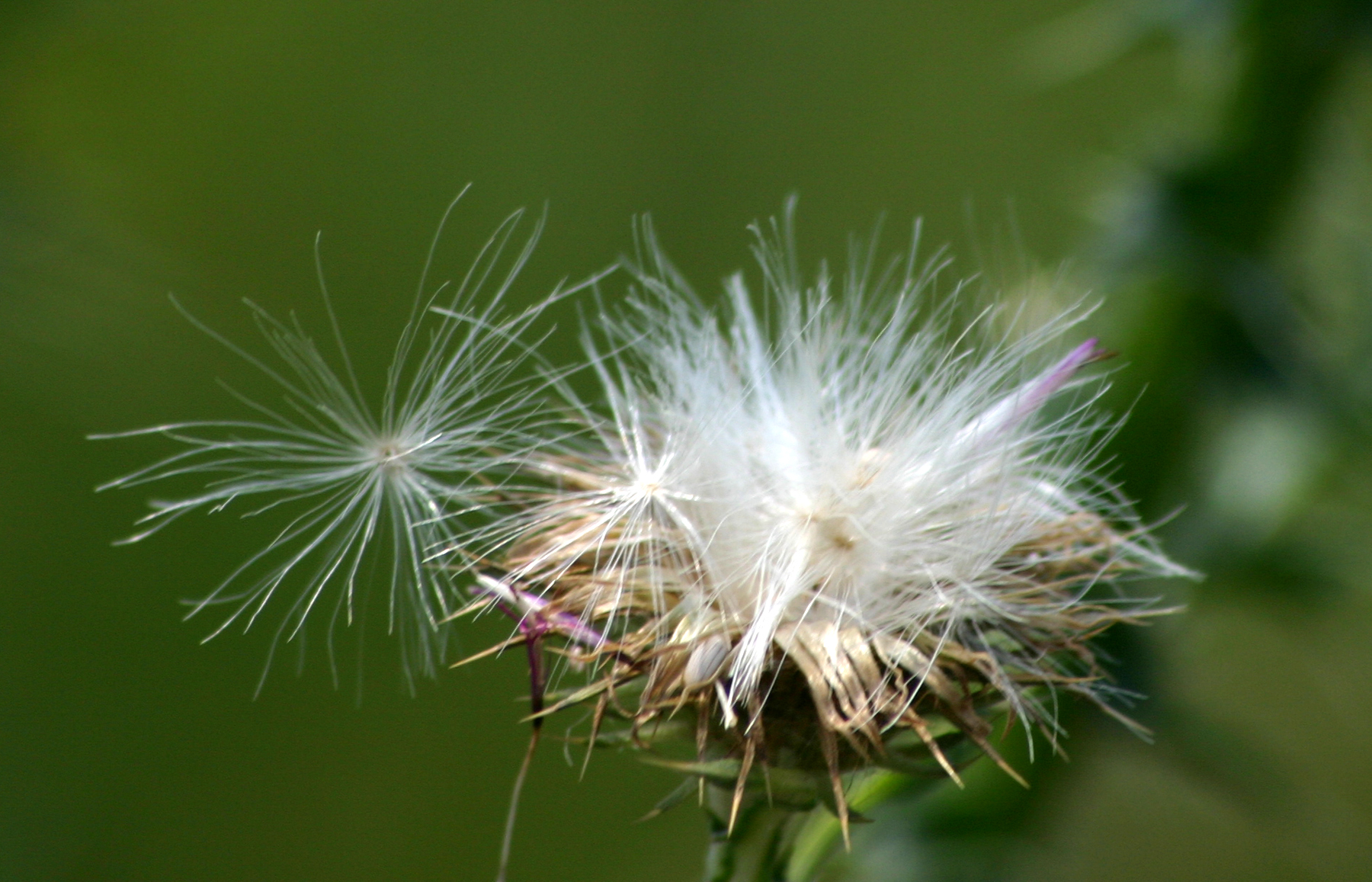
Thistledown, a method of seed dispersal by wind. The tiny seeds are a favourite of goldfinches and some other small birds.

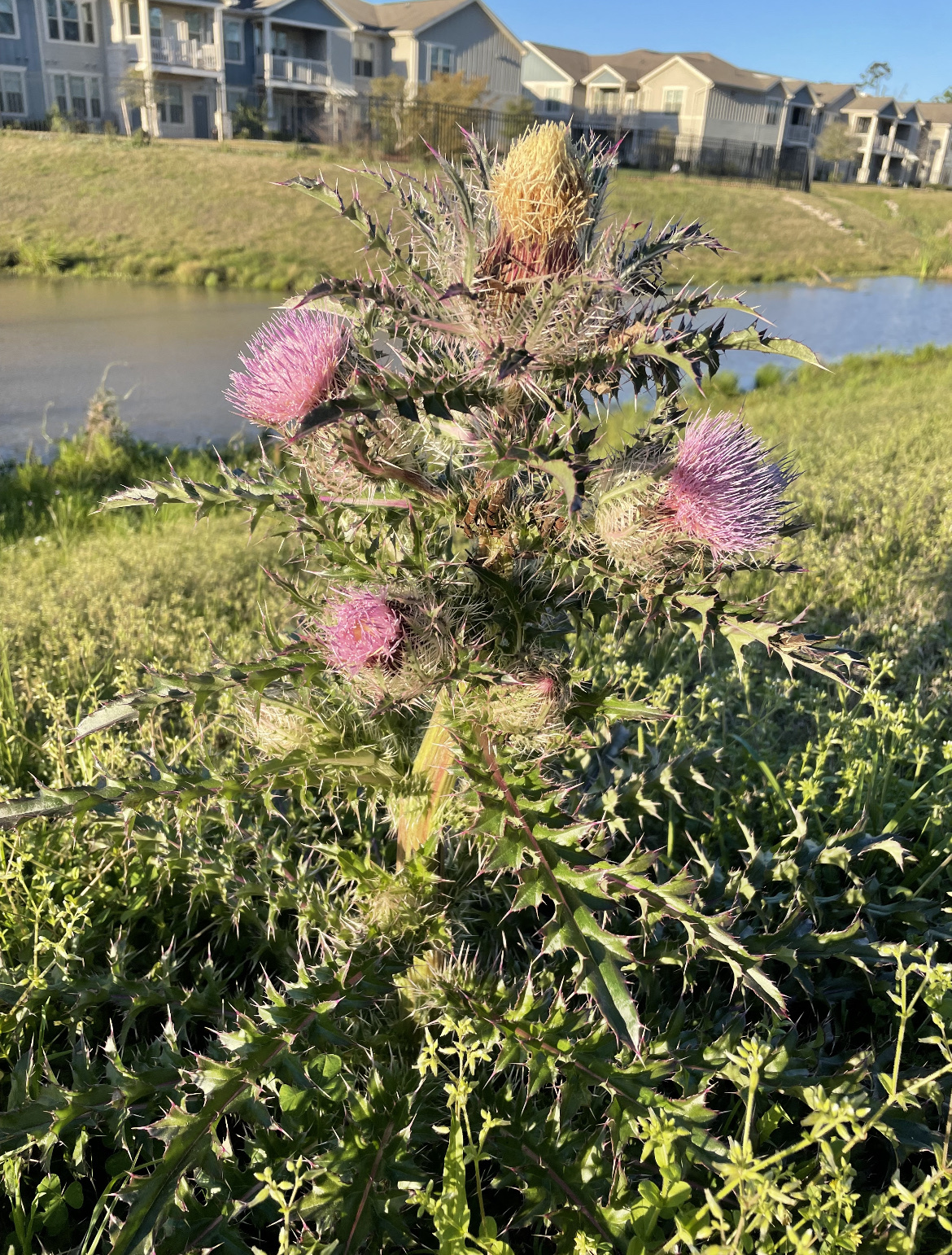
Cirsium horridulum found in southeast Louisiana.

Genera in the Asteraceae with the word thistle often used in their common names include:

- Arctium – Burdock
- Carduus – Musk thistle and others
- Carlina – Carline thistle
- Carthamus – Distaff thistle
- Centaurea – Star thistle
- Cicerbita – Sow thistle
- Cirsium – Melancholy thistle, Creeping thistle, Spear thistle, and others
- Cnicus – Blessed thistle
- Cynara – Artichoke, Cardoon
- Echinops – Globe thistle
- Galactites – Milk thistle
- Notobasis – Syrian thistle
- Onopordum – Cotton thistle, also known as Scots thistle
- Scolymus – Golden thistle or Oyster thistle
- Silybum – Milk or St. Mary's thistle
- Sonchus – Sow thistle

Plants in families other than Asteraceae, which are sometimes called thistle, include:

- Salsola – Russian thistle, Tartar thistle, or Tumbleweed, plants formerly classified in the genus Kali (family Chenopodiaceae)
- Argemone mexicana – Flowering thistle, Purple Prickly Poppy (family Papaveraceae)
- Eryngium – certain species include the word "thistle", such as beethistle, E. articulatum (family Apiaceae)
- Dipsacus fullonum – German names include Hausdistel, Kardendisteln, Roddistel, Sprotdistel and Weberdistel (family Caprifoliaceae)

== Ecology ==
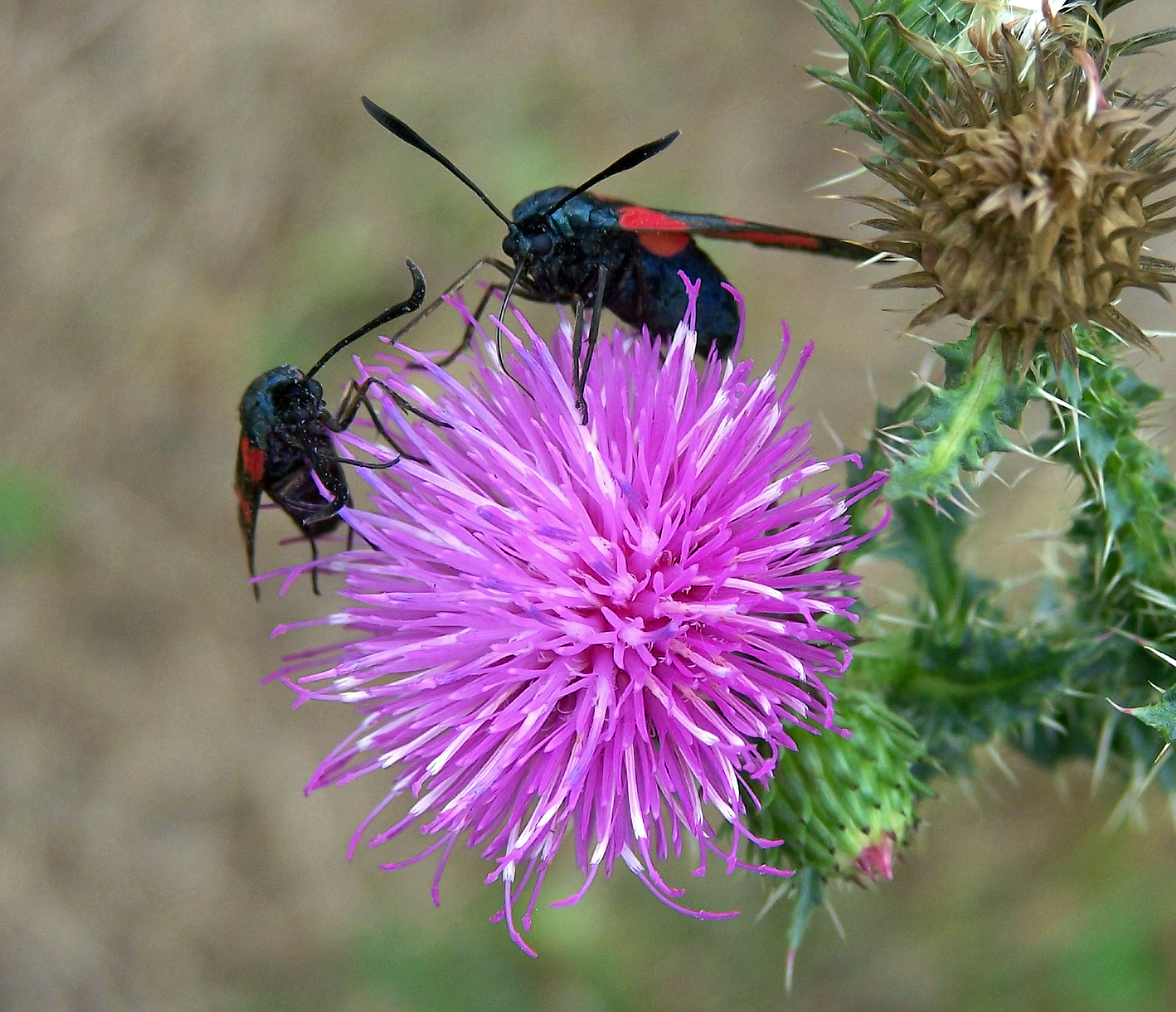
Six-spot burnet moths on a thistle flowerhead

Thistle flowers are the favourite nectar sources of the pearl-bordered fritillary, small pearl-bordered fritillary, high brown fritillary, and dark green fritillary butterflies. Thistles and thistle-seed feeders provide important sustenance for goldfinches. The flowers are strongly favoured by many butterflies besides fritillaries, such as the monarch, skippers, and the various types of tiger swallowtail. Hummingbirds will feed on the flowers of the biennial species, which feature large flowers, as compared with the perennial creeping thistle.

Some thistles, for example Cirsium vulgare, native to Eurasia, have been widely introduced outside their native range. Control measures include Trichosirocalus weevils. A problem with this approach, at least in North America, is that the introduced weevils may affect native thistles at least as much as the desired targets. Another approach towards controlling thistle growth is using thistle tortoise beetles as a biological control agent; through feeding on thistle plants, thistle tortoise beetles skeletonize the leaves and damage the plant.

Thistles are important nectar sources for pollinators. Some ecological organisations, such as the Xerces Society, have attempted to raise awareness of their benefits to counteract the general agricultural, and home garden labeling of thistles as weeds. The monarch butterfly, Danaus plexippus for instance, was highlighted as traditionally relying upon taller large-flowered thistle species such as Tall thistle, Cirsium altissimum, for its migration. Although such organisations focus on the benefits of native thistles, certain non-native thistles, such as Cirsium vulgare in North America, may provide similar benefits to wildlife.

Some prairie and wildflower seed production companies supply bulk seed for native North American thistle species for wildlife habitat restoration, although availability tends to be low. Thistles are particularly valued by bumblebees for their high nectar production. Cirsium vulgare was ranked in the top ten for nectar production in a UK plants survey, conducted by the AgriLand project, and supported by the UK Insect Pollinators Initiative. Bull thistle was a top producer of nectar sugar in another study in Britain, ranked third with a production per floral unit of (2323 ± 418μg).

== Uses ==
Pliny and medieval writers thought it could return hair to bald heads, and that in the early modern period it was believed to be a remedy for headaches, plague, cancer sores, vertigo, and jaundice.

=== Cuisine ===
In the Beira region of Portugal, thistle flowers are used as rennet in cheese making. "Serra da Estrela" is not only the name of a mountain chain in this country, "Serra da Estrela" is also the name of one of the most appreciated cheeses made from sheep's milk.

=== Economic significance ===
Thistles, even if one restricts the term to members of the Asteraceae, are too varied a group for generalisation. Many are troublesome weeds, including some invasive species of Cirsium, Carduus, Silybum and Onopordum. Typical adverse effects are competition with crops and interference with grazing in pastures, where dense growths of spiny vegetation suppress forage plants and repel grazing animals. Some species, although not intensely poisonous, affect the health of animals that ingest them.

The genus Cynara includes the commercially important species of artichoke. Some species regarded as major weeds are sources of vegetable rennet used in commercial cheese making. Similarly, some species of Silybum that occur as weeds are cultivated for seeds that yield vegetable oil and pharmaceutical compounds such as silibinin.

Other thistles that nominally are weeds are important honey plants, both as bee fodder in general, and as sources of luxury monofloral honey products.

== Culture ==
=== Symbolism ===
==== Scottish thistle ====
The thistle has been the national emblem of Scotland since the reign of King Alexander III (1249–1286). According to legend, an invading Norse army was attempting to sneak up at night upon a Scottish army's encampment. One barefoot Norseman stepped on a thistle and cried out in pain, thus alerting Scots to the presence of the invaders. Possibly, this happened in 1263 during the Battle of Largs, which marked the beginning of the departure of King Haakon IV (Haakon the Elder) of Norway who, having control of the Northern Isles and Hebrides, had harried the coast of the Kingdom of Scotland for some years.

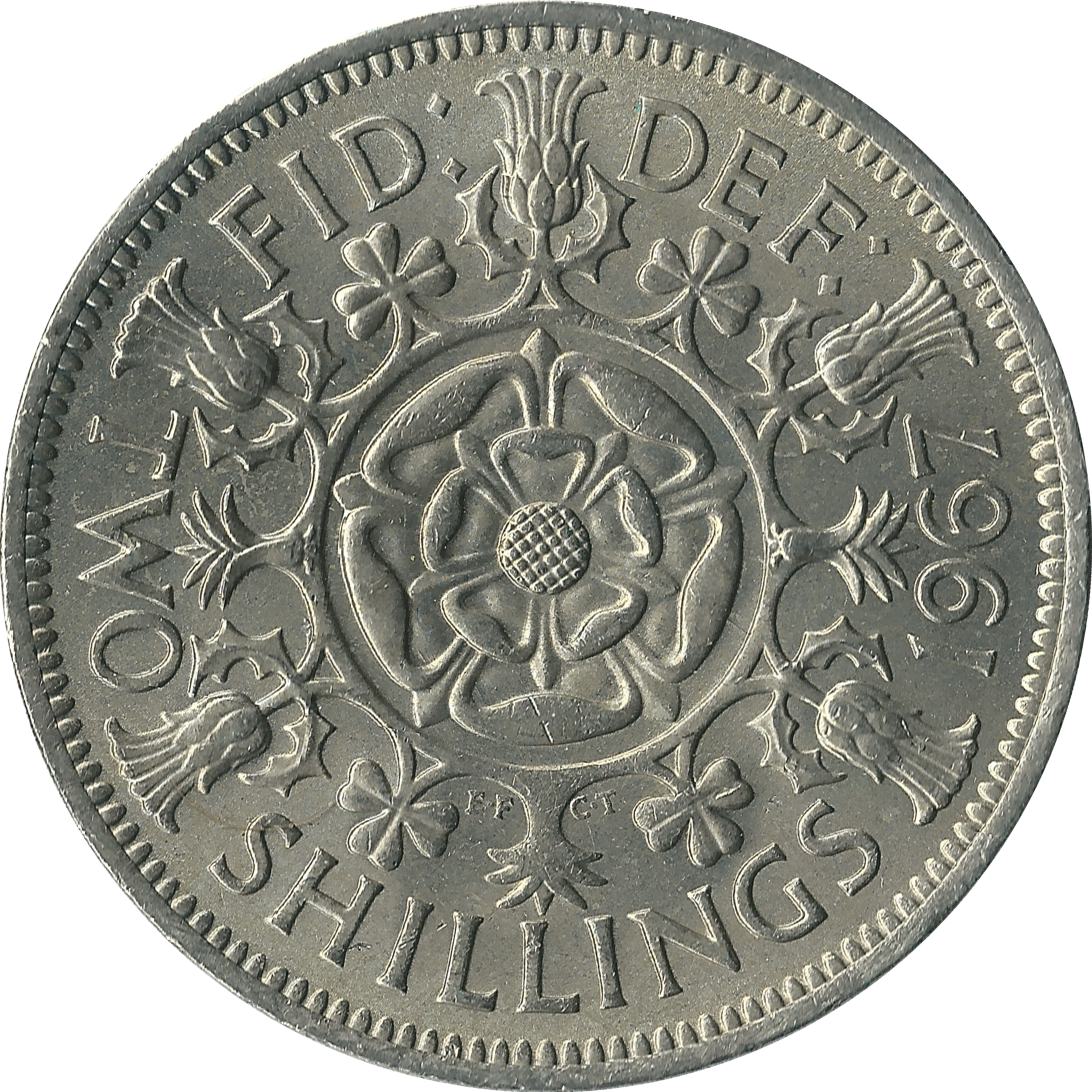
Reverse of a 1967 florin: thistles, shamrocks, leeks, & rose

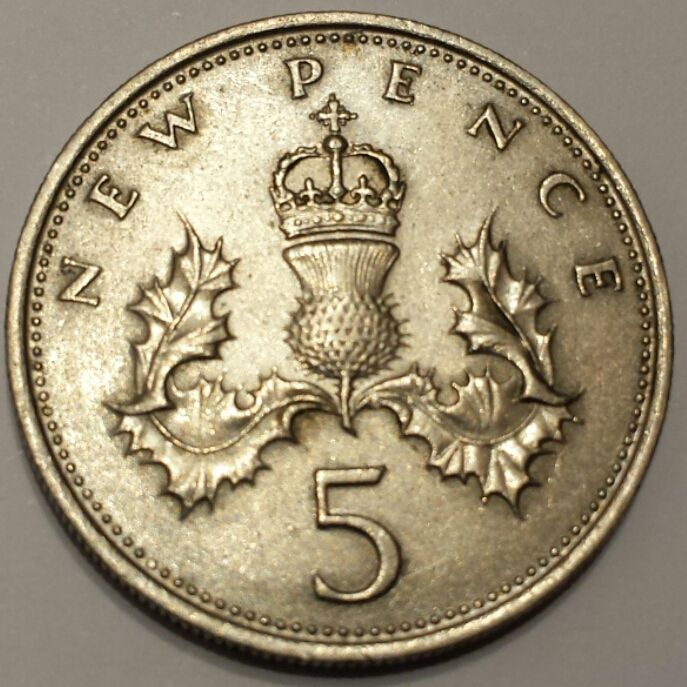
Reverse of five pence: crowned thistle

The thistle was used on silver coins first issued by King James III in 1474 as a Scottish symbol and national emblem. In 1536, the bawbee, a sixpence in the pound Scots, was issued for the first time under King James V; it showed a crowned thistle. Thistles continued to appear regularly on Scottish and later British coinage until 2008, when a 5p coin design showing "The Badge of Scotland, a thistle royally crowned" ceased to be minted, though it remains in circulation. The Most Ancient and Most Noble Order of the Thistle, the highest and oldest chivalric order of Scotland, has thistles on its insignia and a chapel in St Giles's Kirk, Edinburgh, dubbed the Thistle Chapel. The thistle is the main charge of the regimental badge of the Scots Guards, the oldest regiment in the British Army.

Both the Order of the Thistle and the Scots Guards use the motto Nemo me impune lacessit, the motto of the House of Stuart and referring to the thistle's prickly nature. Pound coins with this motto and a thistle were minted in 1984, 1989, and 2014. The combination of thistle and motto first appeared on the bawbee issued by King Charles II. In 1826, the grant of arms to the new National Bank of Scotland stipulates that the shield be surrounded by thistles and "thistle" is used as the name of several Scottish football clubs. Since 1960, a stylised thistle, also representing the Scottish Saltire, has been the logo of the Scottish National Party. The thistle is also seen as the logo for Scottish Rugby. Many businesses in Scotland choose this symbol to represent their organization.

Since 2013, a different stylised thistle, crowned with the Scottish crown, has been the emblem of Police Scotland, and had long featured in the arms of seven of the eight pre-2013 Scottish police services and constabularies, the sole exception being the Northern Constabulary. As part of the arms of the University of Edinburgh, the thistle appears together with a saltire on one of the escutcheons of the Mercat Cross in Edinburgh. The coat of arms and crest of Nova Scotia ("New Scotland"), briefly Scotland's colony, have since the 17th century featured thistles. Following his ascent to the English throne, King James VI of Scotland & I of England used a badge consisting of a Tudor rose "dimidiated" with a Scottish thistle and surmounted by a royal crown.

As the floral emblem of Scotland it appears in the Royal Arms of the United Kingdom thereafter, and was included in the heraldry of various British institutions, such as the Badge of the Supreme Court of the United Kingdom alongside the Tudor rose, Northern Irish flax, and Welsh leek. This floral combination appears on the present issues of the one pound coin. Beside the Tudor rose and Irish shamrock the thistle appears on the badge of the Yeomen of the Guard and the arms of the Canada Company. Issues of the historical florin showed the same flora, later including a leek.

The thistle is also used to symbolise connection with Scotland overseas. For example, in Canada, it is one of the four floral emblems on the flag of Montreal; in the US, Carnegie Mellon University features the thistle in its crest in honour of the Scottish heritage of its founder, Andrew Carnegie, and Annapolis, Maryland features the thistle in its flag and seal. The thistle is also the emblem of the Encyclopædia Britannica (which originated in Edinburgh, Scotland) and Jardine Matheson Holdings Limited (as the company was founded by two Scots).

Which species of thistle is referred to in the original legend is disputed. Popular modern usage favours cotton thistle (Onopordum acanthium), perhaps because of its more imposing appearance, though it is not native and unlikely to have occurred in Scotland in mediaeval times. The spear thistle (Cirsium vulgare), an abundant native species in Scotland, is a more likely candidate. Other species, including dwarf thistle (Cirsium acaule), musk thistle (Carduus nutans), and melancholy thistle (Cirsium heterophyllum) have also been suggested.

Scottish thistle as a Heraldic badge

Badge of the Yeomen of the Guard

Badge of James VI & I. Thistle dimidiated with a Tudor rose

==== Thistle of Lorraine ====
Coat of arms of Nancy, former capital of the Duchy of Lorraine

The thistle, and more precisely Onopordum acanthium, is one of the symbols of Lorraine, together with its coat of arms which displays three avalerions, and the Cross of Lorraine.

Lorraine is a region located in northeastern France, along the border with Luxembourg and Germany. Before the French Revolution, a large part of the region formed the Duchy of Lorraine. In the Middle Ages, the thistle was an emblem of the Virgin Mary because its white sap would bring to mind the milk falling from the breast of the Mother of God. It was later adopted as a personal symbol by René of Anjou, together with the Cross of Lorraine, then known as the Cross of Anjou. It seems through his book Livre du cuer d'amours espris that the Duke chose the thistle as his emblem not only because it was a Christian symbol, but also because he associated it with physical love.

The thistle and the cross were used again by his grandson, René II, Duke of Lorraine, who introduced them in the region. The two symbols became hugely popular among the local people during the Battle of Nancy in 1477, during which the Lorrain army defeated Burgundy. The Duke's motto was "Qui s'y frotte s'y pique", meaning "who touches it, pricks oneself", with a similar idea to the Scottish motto "Nemo me impune lacessit". Nowadays the thistle is still the official symbol of the city of Nancy, as well as the emblem of the AS Nancy football team, and the Lorraine Regional Natural Park.

=== Place names ===
Carduus is the Latin term for a thistle (hence cardoon, chardon in French), and Cardonnacum is a Late Latin word for a place with thistles. This is believed to be the origin of name of the Burgundy village of Chardonnay, Saône-et-Loire, which in turn is thought to be the home of the famous Chardonnay grape variety.
