= Hector Boyes =

Rear-Admiral Hector Boyes CMG CIE
- Born: 20 February 1881
- Died: 23 October 1960 (aged 79)
- Military career
- Allegiance: Great Britain
- Branch: Royal Navy
- Service years: 1895–1934
- Rank: Rear-Admiral
- Commands: HMS Thistle
- Conflicts: Boxer Rebellion; World War I: East Africa Campaign
- Awards: Commander of the Order of St Michael and St George; Order of Aviz (Portugal) mentioned in dispatches (7)
- Other work: Diplomat

Rear-Admiral Hector George Boyes, CMG, CIE (20 February 1881 – 23 October 1960) was an officer of the Royal Navy.

== Background, early career, and World War I ==
Boyes was born in 1881 at Plymouth, the son of a naval officer, Sir George Boyes; he entered the service shortly before his fourteenth birthday. He saw action in the Boxer Rebellion in 1901 as a midshipman, and the following year was an acting sub-lieutenant when he was posted to the battleship HMS Majestic, flagship of the Commander-in-Chief of the Channel Squadron. He was promoted to lieutenant on 15 September 1902, while serving on the Majestic.

By the outbreak of World War I, he was thirty-three years old, and the Flag Lieutenant to the Commander-in-Chief of the China Station. In 1915, Lieutenant-Commander Boyes was assigned to command the gunboat HMS Thistle in the East Africa Campaign. In the subsequent fighting, he was mentioned in dispatches seven times, and earned the Order of St Michael and St George and the Portuguese Order of Aviz.

== Shore appointments and diplomatic duties ==
In 1919, Commander Boyes, now 38 years old, married Eleonora Bille de Falsen, a twenty-year-old half-Norwegian, half-Danish, the daughter of Henrik Anton Falsen, the Consul General of the Russian port of Arkhangelsk, and Ida Bille. They met in Arkhangelsk and had one child, Reginald George Hector Boyes (b 1928). From January 1920 to December 1921 he commanded HMS Hollyhock on the China station. Subsequently, he was promoted to captain, commanding the Australian naval academy at Flinders, the British squadron in the Persian Gulf, and the shore base at Simon's Town in South Africa, before being appointed Chief of Staff to the Commander-in-Chief, The Nore.

Captain Boyes took retirement with the rank of rear admiral in 1934, but he was subsequently appointed as a naval attaché with the temporary rank of captain, serving in Oslo, where he was involved in obtaining an important dossier of German military blueprints which became known as the Oslo Report.

Admiral Boyes continued in the diplomatic service during World War II, serving as attaché in Tokyo until the outbreak of the Pacific War, and then at various embassies in Latin America. He retired for a second time on 31 March 1947, and died in 1960.

== Sources ==
- Brief biography at the Liddell Hart Centre for Military Archives:
- Medal collection and biographical sketch:
- Genealogical information:
