= Thistledown =

Thistledown may refer to:

- The soft feathery material which protects the fruiting part of a thistle
- Thistledown (film), a 1938 British musical film
- Thistledown (racecourse), a thoroughbred racing track in North Randall, Ohio, near Cleveland
- Thistledown, Colorado
- Thistledown family, characters in The Dark Elf Trilogy by R. A. Salvatore
- Operation Thistledown, a World War II operation in Italy
- A fictional starship in The Way, a trilogy of novels by Greg Bear

== See also ==
- Thistledome
