= HMS Thistle =

Six ships of the Royal Navy have borne the name HMS Thistle, after the thistle, the national flower of Scotland:

- HMS Thistle (1808) was a 10-gun schooner launched in 1808 and wrecked on 6 March 1811.
- HMS Thistle (1812) was a 12-gun brig launched in 1812 and broken up in 1823.
- HMS Thistle (1855) was a Dapper-class wood screw gunboat launched in 1855 and broken up in 1863.
- HMS Thistle (1868) was a composite screw gunvessel launched in 1868 and sold in 1888.
- HMS Thistle (1899) was a Bramble-class gunboat launched in 1899 and sold in 1926.
- HMS Thistle (N24) was a T-class submarine launched in 1938 and sunk in 1940.

== Royal Scots Navy ==
There was also an earlier HMS Thistle that served in the Royal Scots Navy during the Anglo-Spanish War (1625–30) and Anglo-French War (1627–29).
