= HMS Thistle (1899) =

Bramble-class gunboat of the Royal Navy

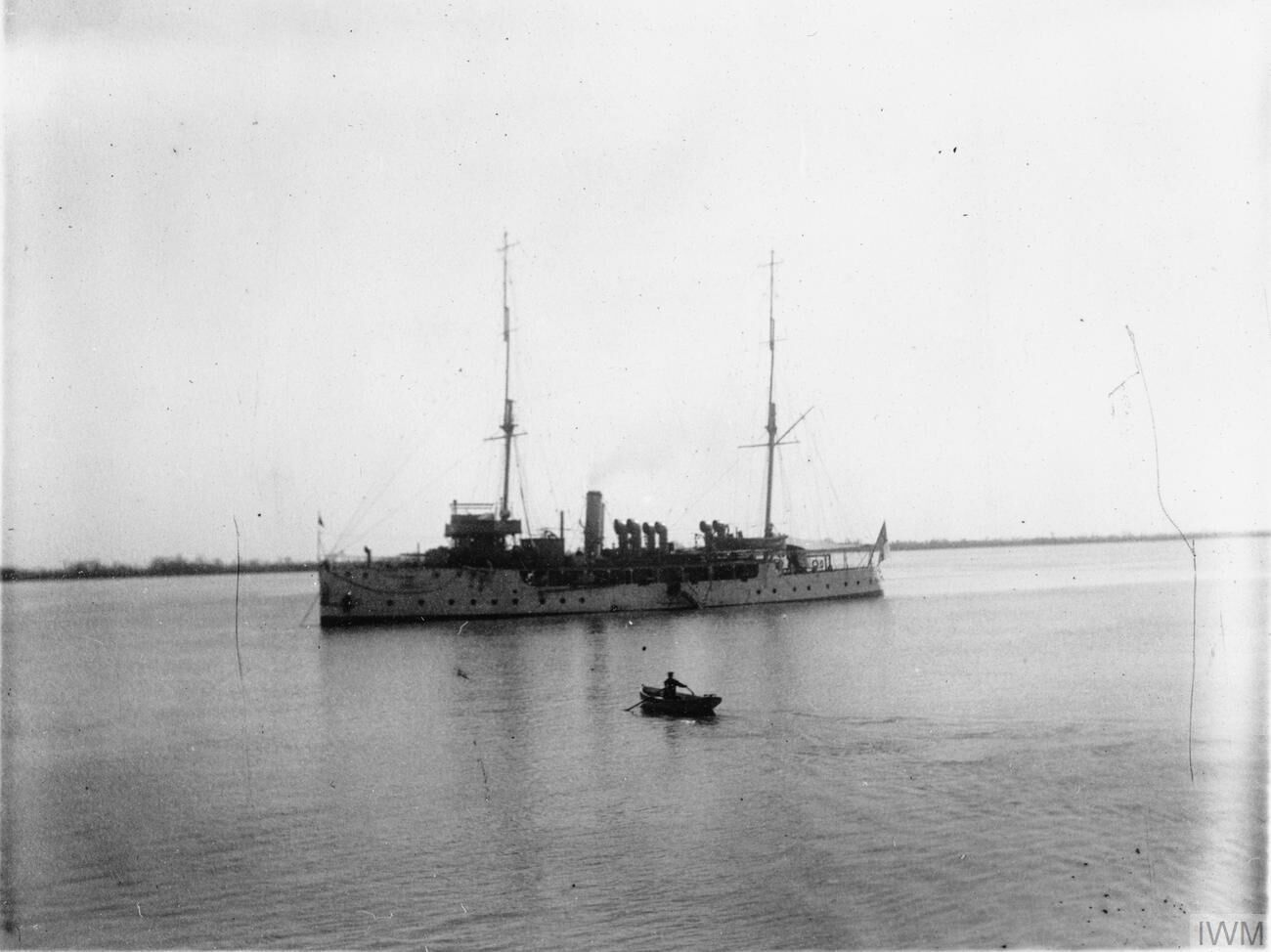
- Thistle on the Yangtze in 1910

History

United Kingdom
- Name: HMS Thistle
- Namesake: The Thistle
- Builder: London & Glasgow
- Laid down: 2 December 1897
- Launched: 22 July 1899
- Fate: Scrapped, 1926

General characteristics
- Class & type: Bramble-class gunboat (1898)
- Displacement: 710 long tons (721 t)
- Length: 180 ft (54.9 m)
- Beam: 33 ft (10.1 m)
- Draught: 8 ft (2.4 m)
- Installed power: 1,300 ihp (970 kW)
- Propulsion: 2 shafts, triple-expansion steam engines; Coal-fired boilers; Auxiliary sailing rig
- Speed: 13.5 knots (25.0 km/h; 15.5 mph)
- Range: 2000 nm at 11.5 kn (trials, 1899); 1000 nm at 5.5 kn (effective, 1915)
- Complement: 85
- Armament: As Built, 1899; 2 × 4 in (102 mm) QF; 4 × 12 pdr / 3 in (76 mm) QF; 4 × 0.45 in (11 mm) Maxim gun; As Refitted, 1922; 2 × 4 in (102 mm) QF; 2 × Vickers 3-pounder / 1.85 in (47 mm) anti-aircraft gun; 2 × 2-pounder / 1.6 in (41 mm) pom-pom; 4 × Hotchkiss 3-pounder / 1.85 in (47 mm) saluting gun

HMS Thistle was a Bramble-class gunboat of the Royal Navy, launched in 1899 and broken up in 1926. She was the last classic Victorian gunboat, and the last British warship to retain a practical sailing rig.

== Design ==
HMS Thistle was the last of four Bramble-class vessels, built in the 1890s to patrol the remote outposts of the British Empire in the era of gunboat diplomacy.

In most respects, she resembled a scaled-down protected cruiser, a steel warship with a modern design and up-to-date armament, and very comfortable quarters for her crew. However, in order to navigate on uncharted coasts and tropical rivers, she was given a very compact shallow-draught hull, and this meant she only had a very limited coal supply. In addition, low technology was used to minimize construction cost and logistical requirements. As a result, the Thistle was given a two-masted sailing rig as a supplementary means of propulsion, along with a number of other anachronistic features such as a manual capstan to raise the anchor, and candles rather than light bulbs.

Policy changes shortly after the Thistle's launch meant that no further gunboats would be built for the Royal Navy, and the use of sail propulsion was strongly discouraged. Nonetheless, problems with using Thistle's engines for long-range cruising would prompt the restoration of her sailing rig in 1919, while her usefulness on colonial stations meant that she was refitted to maintain her capabilities in the 1920s, acquiring an anti-aircraft armament.

== Service history ==
The Thistle was laid down at the London & Glasgow shipyards in Govan in December 1897. She was the last ship of her class to be launched, on 22 June 1899, and would not complete her fitting-out until 1901. On her sea-trials, she performed well, reaching her design speed of 13.5 knots under engine power.

=== North Atlantic and West Africa, 1902–1905 ===
HMS Thistle was initially deployed to the North America and West Indies Station under the command of Lieutenant and Commander Edward Stafford Houseman. During Spring 1902 she toured the North Atlantic Ocean, visiting São Vicente, Cape Verde, Barbados, Bermuda, and New York. After arrival at Halifax, Nova Scotia, in early May, she was fitted out for Newfoundland fishery protection service. In August she visited Horta, Azores, Sao Vicente, Sierra Leone and Gabon River, before she arrived at Saint Helena in October 1902.

In June 1904 she was posted in West Africa, when her crew provided teams for the first competitive games of cricket and football in Nigeria, being convincingly beaten in both matches by local teams from Hope Waddell Training Institution. In 1905, she was at Simon's Bay to witness the arrival of Admiral Rozhestvensky's fleet on their long, laborious voyage from the Baltic Sea to the Battle of Tsushima. The fact that only Thistle and the cruiser HMS Crescent were available to deter an entire fleet of battleships caused considerable local alarm.

=== Far East, 1906–1914 ===
The Thistle was subsequently transferred to the China Station, where she was assigned to protect British imperial interests in the treaty ports along the Yangtze river, and was deployed 600 miles (970 km) inland at Hankou (now part of the Wuhan conurbation). The early years of this assignment were relatively leisurely, and the Thistle's surgeon, Walter Perceval Yetts, acquired a deep admiration for Chinese civilization, which would lead him to become an important sinologist.

In 1911, however, the Thistle found herself in the front line of the crisis which developed into the 1911 Revolution. She was subsequently withdrawn to Hong Kong, spending increasingly long stretches in harbour, and making occasional voyages across the South China Sea to coastal anchorages in mainland China. She now relied exclusively on her engines, and when the Great War broke out, Thistle and the other gunboats on the China Station were decommissioned to provide a crew for the old battleship HMS Triumph, which was now regarded as a more important military asset.

=== East Africa, 1915–1918 ===
In 1915, it was decided to reactivate HMS Thistle and transfer her to East Africa. The initial intention was to send her into the Rufiji Delta to fight the German cruiser SMS Königsberg, but the Admiralty modified its plans by also sending the monitors HMS Mersey and HMS Severn through the Suez Canal, and they subsequently destroyed the Königsberg before the Thistle even set sail.

Nonetheless, the Thistle was recommissioned under a new captain, Lieutenant-Commander Hector Boyes, and set out to steam from Hong Kong to Zanzibar. The first stages as far as the Straits of Malacca were characterized by mechanical problems, and Thistle spent much of this part of the journey being towed by other ships. The machinery proved less problematic on the long treks across the Indian Ocean from Singapore to Colombo and from the Maldives to the Seychelles, but on both these stages, the ship was close to running out of coal by the time she reached her destination. HMS Thistle eventually arrived in East Africa in November 1915, and would remain there for the rest of World War I.

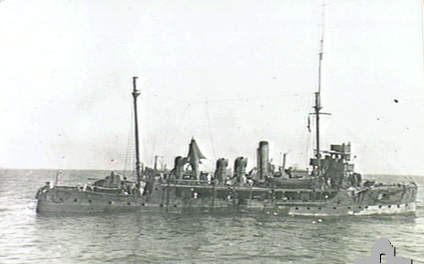
HMS Thistle in East Africa.

In September 1916, the Thistle participated in the amphibious campaign against German East Africa, providing inshore protection for landings at Dar es Salaam and elsewhere, and pushing through difficult channels to bring fire support to soldiers striking inland. The Thistle was somewhat overshadowed by the continuing presence of the more powerful Mersey and Severn, but the gunboat nonetheless distinguished herself, particularly in the defense of Lindi against a German artillery position, an action which earned Commander Boyes the Order of St Michael and St George, and Leading Stoker James Leach the Conspicuous Gallantry Medal.

The most important moment of the gunboat's time in East Africa was still to come, however. By July 1918, the German column had entered Portuguese Mozambique, and routed the opposing Anglo-Portuguese troops. The Thistle was anchored in the harbour at Quelimane, and seemed to be the last line of defence against a major German victory. The port was supposedly defended by the Portuguese cruiser Adamastor, but the governor, Colonel Tómas de Sousa Rosas, was intent on using the ship to simply evacuate himself and his luggage, abandoning the harbour and its stockpiles and supply facilities to the German forces. Commander Boyes resolved to stand and fight with the Thistle and her small crew, an action which shamed Sousa Rosas and Adamastor into holding their ground, thus dissuading the Germans from an attack. This act of determination earned Boyes the Portuguese Order of Aviz.

=== West Africa, 1919–1924 ===
In 1919, HMS Thistle was ordered to return to West Africa, but almost as soon as the ship left Zanzibar, the starboard propeller failed. The gunboat's new captain, Lieutenant-Commander Cecil Cruttwell, had been educated aboard the square-rigged training ship HMS Conway, and he promptly set the crew to making a new set of sails.

The new sails seem to have always been used in combination with whatever engine power was available, increasing speed and thus reducing fuel consumption, but they were seen as useful enough to be retained when the engine was repaired. The limited coal supply continued to be a problem, and on a visit to Liberia in 1920, the gunboat's crew had to obtain wood in Monrovia in to avoid running completely out of fuel. HMS Thistle would retain a sailing rig for the rest of her career.

The Thistle seems to have no longer had her main topmast by 1919, as the mainmast was demoted to become the mizzen, and the ship adopted what was effectively a ketch sailplan, with a jib in the bows, a tall square-rigged foremast carrying a mainsail and topsail, and two fore-and-aft sails on the shorter mizzen, a staysail and a trysail spanker. Subsequently, she adopted a reduced rig of just three sails - her jib, one square sail on the foremast, and a single fore-and-aft sail on the mizzen.

Although the sails were only used in conjunction with the engines, the fact that the Thistle had returned to sail as a means of propulsion distinguishes her from a number of other Royal Navy warships which resumed the use of staysails to improve their seakeeping and stationkeeping ability (a practice which was not fully abandoned until HMS Reclaim paid off in 1979).

The Thistle remained on the Atlantic coast of Africa. She was refitted and rearmed, losing her secondary artillery and machine guns in exchange for anti-aircraft cannons, and she was still performing gunboat diplomacy in early 1925. A few months later, however, HMS Thistle sailed for home. International newspapers reported on the final passing of the age of sail.

The hulk of Thistle was subsequently sold for scrap in August 1926.

== Sources ==
- Anon, "Thistle", Journal of the American Society of Naval Engineers, 11 (1899), p. 1106
- U.S. Office of Naval Intelligence, Notes on Naval Progress, November 1899 (ONI General Information Series, No. XVIII; Washington, 1899)
- Efiong U. Aye, Hope Waddell Training Institution: Life and Work (1894-1978)
- T.A. Brassey, ed. The Naval Annual, 1902 (Portsmouth, 1902)
- Lawrence G. Green, Eight Bells at Salamander (Cape Town, 1960)
- Edward Paice, Tip & Run: The Untold Tragedy of the Great War in Africa (London 2008)
- Antony Preston and John Major, Send a Gunboat: The Victorian Navy And Supremacy At Sea, 1854–1904 (London 1967, 2007)
- Kemp Tolley, Yangtze Patrol: The U.S. Navy in China (Annapolis, MD, 1971, 2000)

== Online sources ==
- "Britain's Last Sailing Warship to Be Scrapped", Milwaukee Sentinel, 17 May 1925 1
- Logs of HMS Thistle, 1914-1924 (Naval-History.Net): 1, 2, 3.
- Details at the Clydebuilt Ships Database:
- Photographs taken by Lt. Douglas Claris of HMS Thistle, 1910-1912 (Imperial War Museum): p1, p2, p3.
- Summary of Cmdr. Boyes' command of Thistle in 1915-1918 and the medals awarded: .
- Leading Stoker Leach's gallantry award:
