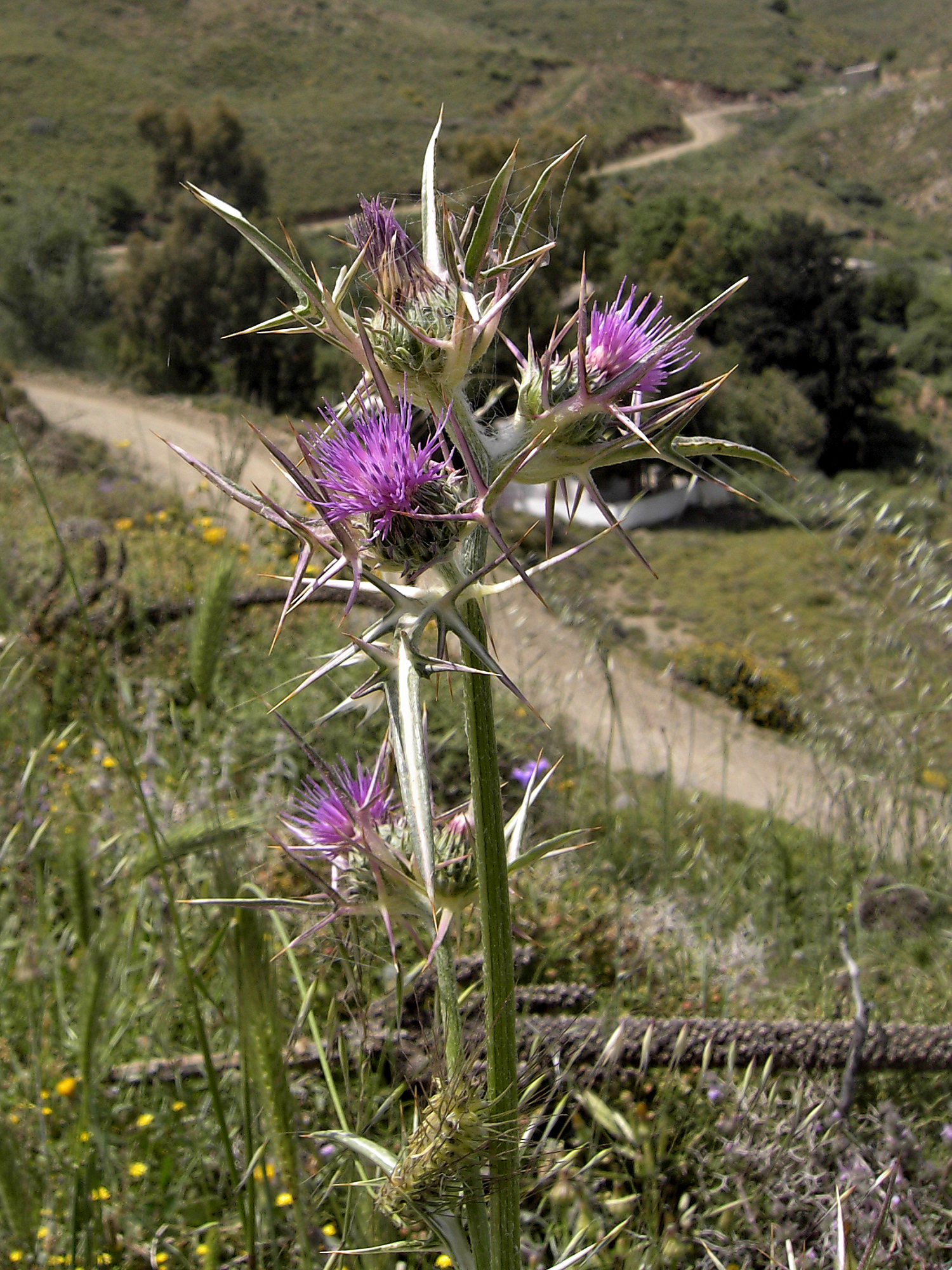

Scientific classification
- Kingdom: Plantae
- Clade: Tracheophytes
- Clade: Angiosperms
- Clade: Eudicots
- Clade: Asterids
- Order: Asterales
- Family: Asteraceae
- Genus: Notobasis
- Species: N. syriaca

Binomial name
- Notobasis syriaca (L.) Cass.

Synonyms
- Carduus syriacus L.; Cirsium syriacum (L.) Gaertn.; Cnicus syriacus (L.) Willd.; Cirsium bracteatum Link; Cirsium maculatum Moench; Cnicus syriacus (L.) Roth; Cnicus obvallatus Salzm. ex DC.

= Notobasis syriaca =

Species of flowering plant

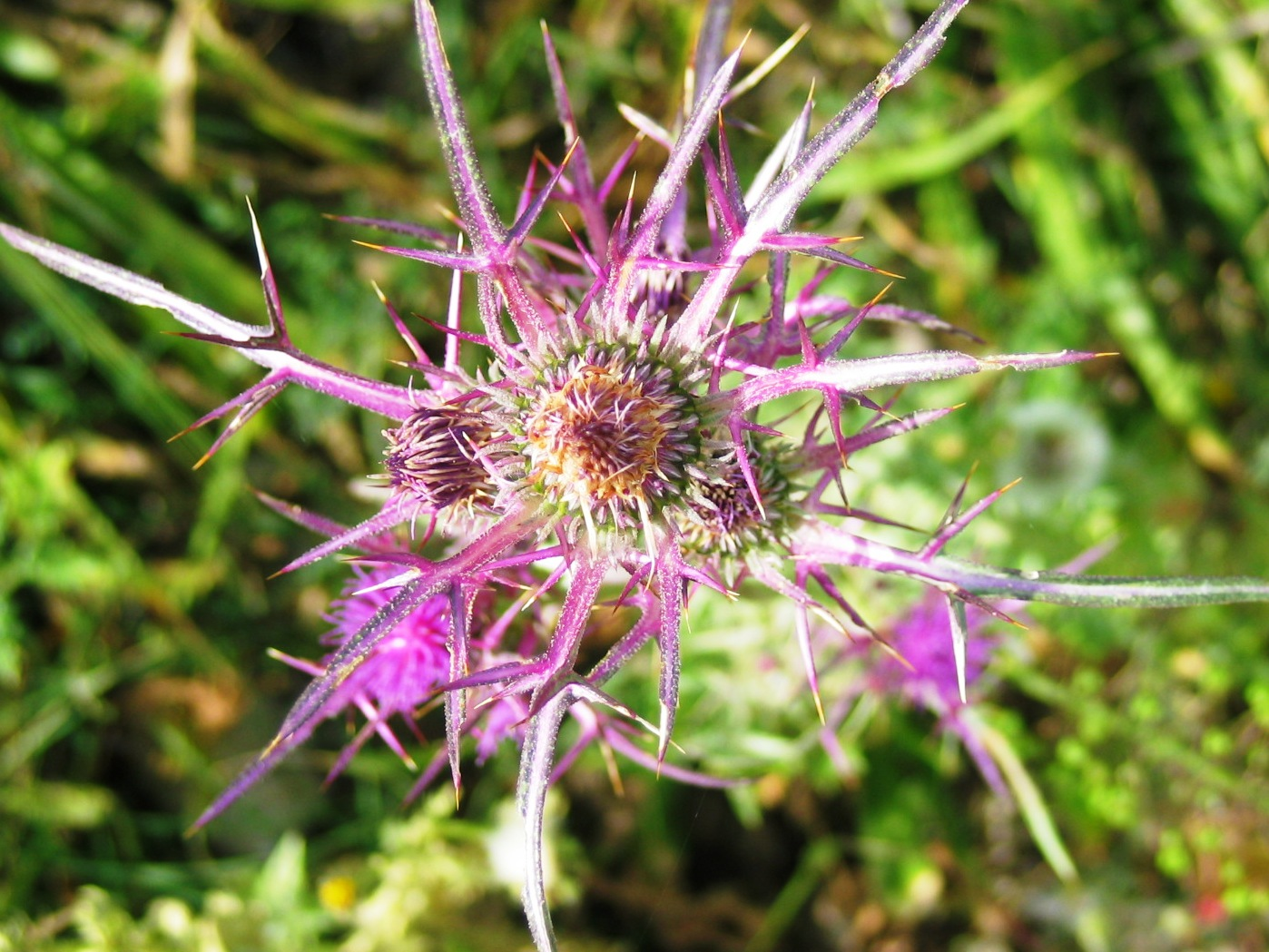
Flowerhead

Notobasis syriaca, or the Syrian thistle, is a species of flowering plant in the tribe Cardueae within the family Asteraceae. It is native to the Mediterranean region and the Middle East, from Madeira, the Canary Islands, Morocco and Portugal east to Egypt, Iran and Azerbaijan.

It is an annual plant belonging to the semi-desert flora, growing to 30–100 cm tall. The leaves are spirally arranged on the stems, deeply lobed, grey-green with white veins, and sharp spines on the margins and apex. The flowers are purple, produced in a dense flowerhead (capitulum) 2 cm diameter, surrounded by several spiny basal bracts.

In the Greek island of Crete, where it is called agavanos (αγκάβανος), its tender shoots are peeled and eaten raw by the local people.

It is naturalised in Australia.
