= Bramble-class gunboat (1898) =

Royal Navy gunboat class

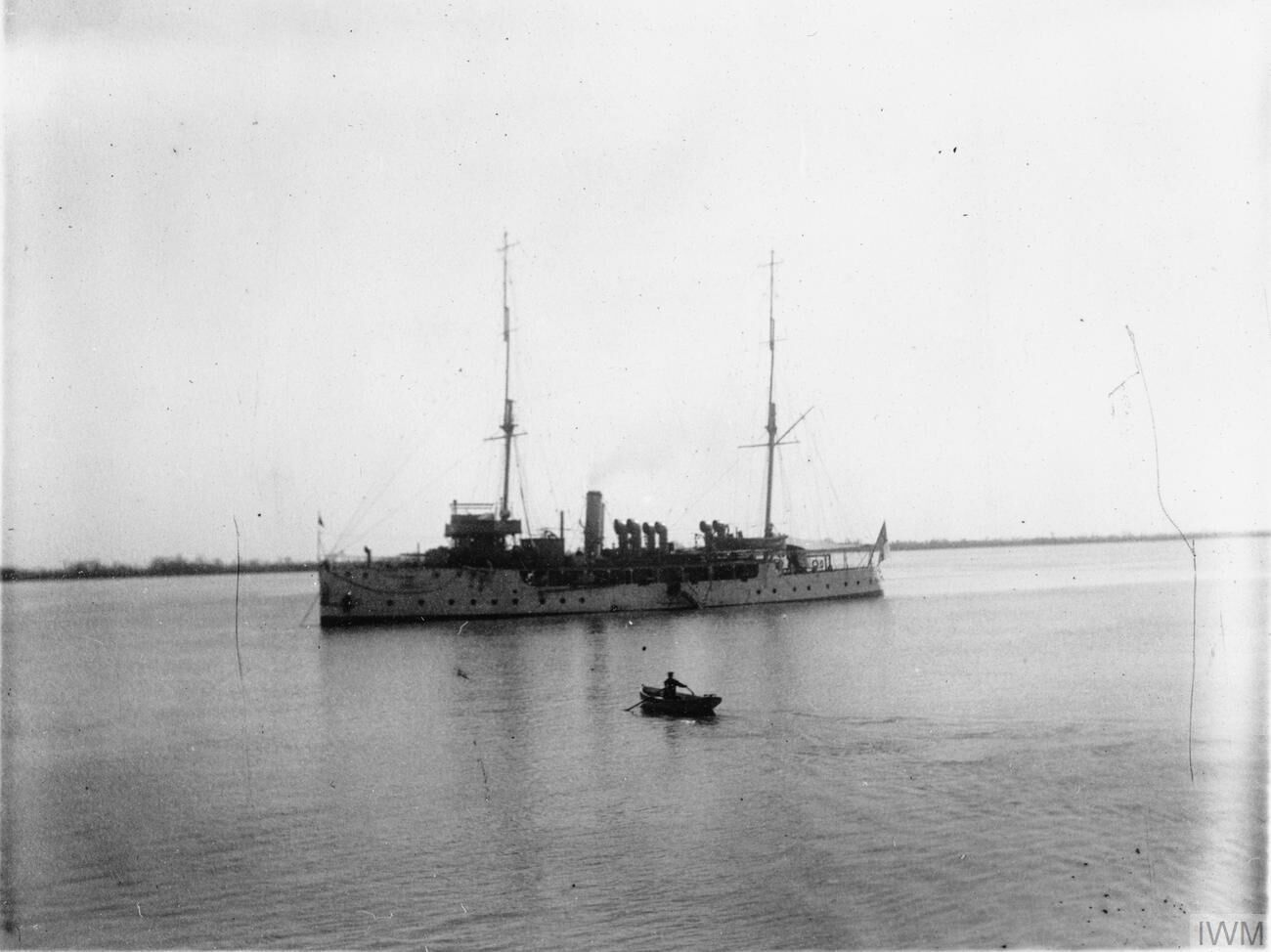
- HMS Thistle, c. 1910.

Class overview
- Name: Bramble class
- Builders: W.H. Potter & Sons; London & Glasgow
- Operators: Royal Navy
- Preceded by: Redbreast class (1889)
- Succeeded by: n/a – designation abolished
- Built: 1898–1899
- In commission: 1900–1925
- Completed: 4

General characteristics
- Type: First class gunboat
- Displacement: 710 tons standard
- Length: 180 ft (55 m)
- Beam: 33 ft (10 m)
- Draught: 8 ft (2.4 m)
- Installed power: 1,300 ihp (970 kW)
- Propulsion: Triple-expansion steam engine; Twin screw
- Speed: 13.5 kn (25.0 km/h)
- Range: 2050 nm at 10.85 kn (HMS Bramble); 2000 nm at 11.5 kn (HMS Thistle)
- Boats & landing craft carried: 1 × 27' whaler; 1 × 25' cutter; 1 × 16' skiff or dinghy; 1 × 23' steam cutter
- Crew: 85
- Armament: 2 × 4-inch QF; 4 × 12-pdr QF; 4 × 0.45-inch Maxim gun

The Bramble-class gunboat was a type of warship used by the Royal Navy between the 1890s and the 1920s. The four ships of this class were notable as the final development of the Victorian gunboat tradition, and for being one of the last classes of warship designed to travel under sail. One of them, HMS Thistle, retained a functional sailing rig into the mid-1920s.

== Design ==
The four Bramble-class gunboats were designed to protect the far-flung outposts of Great Britain's colonial empire. At 180 feet long and 33 feet in beam, with a draft of just 8 feet and a displacement of only 710 tons, they were the smallest seagoing vessels built for the Royal Navy in the 1890s. They were also among the cheapest, built at a cost of just over £50,000 each, less than 5% of the cost of a contemporary battleship.

=== Limited steaming range and the continuing need for sails ===
The small dimensions and shallow draught of the Bramble class were designed to facilitate navigation on the complex coastlines and great rivers of Africa, South Asia and the Far East. The drawback this imposed was a limited fuel supply. The type entered service with a standard bunkerage of just 50 tons of coal. For Thistle, considered one of the better-performing ships of the class, this would only provide two and a half days' movement at her sustained cruising speed of 11.5 knots, and full-speed runs used nearly twice the quantity of coal over any given length of time. In practice, storage was found for 145 tons of coal, but this was still sufficient for only one week of cruising.

The Bramble class were therefore designed with a sailing rig to supplement their engines. This was still widely accepted in the 1890s as a necessity for long-range warships, which would not always have reliable access to coaling stations. Modern ships which retained a full sailing rig in the 1890s included the Russian armoured cruiser Rurik, the six German Bussard-class light cruisers, the United States Navy's Annapolis-class gunboats, and the Royal Navy's own Condor-class and Cadmus-class sloops.

However, the use of sails was not universally accepted: the armoured battleships of the great powers had become so large and heavy that they had abandoned the remnants of sailing rig in the mid-1880s, and modernizers argued that any sailing warship was automatically obsolete.

Whereas most cruisers of the 1890s adopted a three-masted barque or barquentine rig combining a strong emphasis on fore-and-aft sails with a partial square rig, the Bramble class differed by being designed as two-masted ships, and in 1911, the authoritative partnership of Sir Philip Watts and John Harper Narbeth noted that they only used a "reduced" fore-and-aft sailplan. Thus rigged, they somewhat resembled the much larger contemporary Royal Navy protected cruisers such as the Astrea class and Eclipse class, which had two "military masts", principally used for signal halyards, lookout positions and fighting tops, but designed to set auxiliary fore-and-aft sails in an emergency. On the other hand, HMS Thistle used some square sails, and there appears to be no clear evidence what their designed sailplan was (an original brig or brigantine sailplan like the earlier HMS Temeraire cannot be ruled out).

=== Other features ===
In order to further reduce the logistical requirements (and construction costs) of the new gunboats, a number of other decisions were taken which seemed almost willfully anachronistic. They had copper sheathing to protect their hulls against fouling in tropical seas. With minimal machinery, old-fashioned human strength on the capstan was required to raise the anchors, and a functional ship's wheel was provided to turn the rudder. All lighting came from candles rather than light bulbs. Only one of the four ship's boats was equipped with an engine, the rest being powered by sails and oars. Some of the guns were even mounted internally behind gunports.

In some important respects, however the gunboats were thoroughly up-to-date. Their armament of two 4-inch guns, four 12-pounders and four or more heavy-calibre Maxim guns was modern, and the firepower it provided was comparable to that of comparable ships from rival navies, such as the German gunboat SMS Panther. Each ship's triple-expansion steam engine was capable of 13.5 knots, only slightly slower than contemporary battleships and cruisers, and their hulls were built of steel, exploiting metallurgical advances of the 1880s, rather than using older wrought iron or composite construction techniques.

In layout, the gunboats were also modern, resembling a miniature version of contemporary protected cruisers, with a straight stem, high forecastle, taller charthouse, and a long low deckhouse extending aft to an even lower quarterdeck. This was a distinct contrast with the sloops of the Condor and Cadmus classes, which resembled contemporary sailing windjammers with a bowsprit and figurehead, a high freeboard, and a raised poop deck aft.

Internally, the class also adopted the defining characteristic of the protected cruiser, positioning the coal bunkers to act as a form of armour around the vital spaces. The parallel was also expressed in other ways, as U.S. Navy observers noted that the quality of the fittings, both mechanical and domestic, was comparable throughout to that of a large cruiser: the crew cabins were all generously wood-panelled and comfortably air-conditioned, features that were rationalized with the claim that they would protect the crew from the heat of a metal hull under tropical skies. There was even an icemaker. They were fitted with a complete shade deck of teak and felt.

=== Later modifications ===
Almost at the moment that the ships entered service, high-level opinion in the Royal Navy swung decisively against the use of sail-power (and indeed against gunboats in principle). The sails were packed away, and gradually the apparatus of rigging and spars was physically discarded. During World War I, the ships retained only their immobile lower masts, and in some cases the fore topmast to support a radio antenna.

The loss of sailing capabilities made long-range deployment problematic, as the gunboats now had to travel with extra coal supply heaped on their open decks, and their engines struggled to propel them on sustained ocean-crossing voyages. HMS Thistle eventually reverted to a practical sailing rig in 1919, but adopted a progressively simplified arrangement, going from a brig to a ketch and finally becoming a sort of cutter.

In the 1920s, the two surviving ships of the type were re-armed. They retained their two 4-inch guns, but exchanged their 12-pounders and Maxims for an anti-aircraft armament of two Vickers 3-pounders and two 2-pounder pom-poms. Four Hotchkiss 3-pounders were also carried as saluting guns.

=== Japanese derivatives ===
The Imperial Japanese Navy adapted the design of the Bramble class as the model for two gunboats of its own, though both ships differed in many detail from their British model, as well as from each other. The Uji was launched in 1903, and her plans were further modified for Saga in 1912.

== Service history ==
Two of the gunboats were laid down at the W.H. Potter & Sons shipyard in Liverpool on 1 December 1897, while the other two were begun the next day by London & Glasgow in Govan. The Liverpool ships were launched as HMS Bramble (26 November 1898) and HMS Britomart (29 March 1899), while their counterparts in Glasgow were named HMS Dwarf (15 November 1898) and HMS Thistle (22 June 1899). These names had all been borne by distinguished precursors among the small warships of the Royal Navy.

=== HMS Dwarf in West Africa, 1899–1925 ===
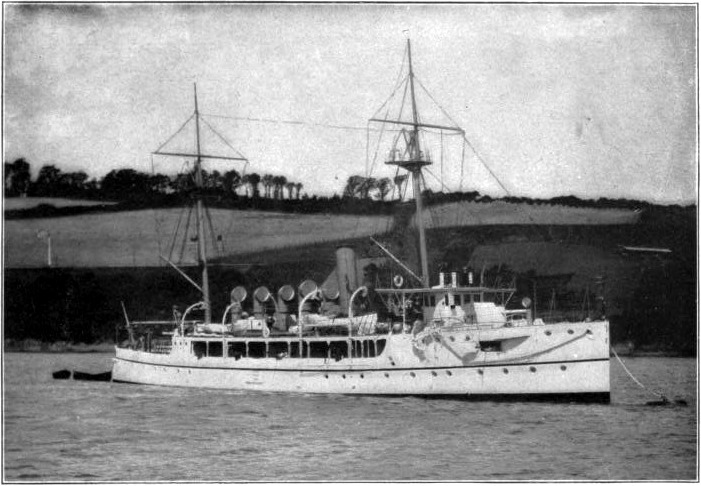
HMS "Dwarf", c. 1905

HMS Dwarf was the first ship of the class to enter service, being commissioned on 31 August 1899. She spent her entire active career around the western and southern coasts of Africa, covering a vast and varied zone from Gibraltar to the Limpopo River. During her career she participated in the Boer War of 1899–1902, where she was one of the first British ships equipped with radio, and in 1914, she played a prominent role in a successful Allied naval campaign against German West Africa, defeating the armed steamer Nachtigal in a ship-to-ship engagement.

In the later stages of her career, HMS Dwarf appears to have spent periods in reserve at Gibraltar and may have only been put into commission when a ship with her shallow-draught capabilities was specifically needed. She was eventually paid off around 1925, and sold for scrap the next year.

=== Bramble and Britomart, 1900–1920 ===
HMS Bramble and HMS Britomart were commissioned simultaneously on 28 June 1900, and dispatched together for the China Station. They would remain there for the majority of their careers, although between 1906 and 1915, evidence suggests that they only spent limited periods at sea.

Bramble and Britomart were put back in commission in late 1915, and moved to the Indian Ocean. They subsequently alternated between long deployments in the Persian Gulf in support of the Mesopotamian campaign, and periods of refit in Bombay.

HMS Bramble was paid off on 5 October 1919, and sold for scrap in January 1920. Britomart is sometimes said to have shared her fate, as she had shared her career, but in fact she remained in service for a few months longer, and she was eventually sold on to a civilian owner on 6 October 1920, and modified to serve as a merchant ship, retaining her old name. In 1925, her name was changed to Shakuntala (Shakuntala in the Mahabharata, like Britomart in The Faerie Queene, is a heroine characterized by chaste loyalty to a true love who is unaware of her identity). Sources state that the former gunboat was eventually scrapped in 1926.

=== HMS Thistle, 1901–1925 ===
The Thistle had the most diverse career of all the Bramble-class gunboats. In varied pre-war duties in West Africa and on the Yangtze, she played a role in the introduction of football in Nigeria, and single-handedly attempted to contain the unrest in Hankou which precipitated the 1912 Revolution.

In 1915, Thistle was dispatched across the Indian Ocean to participate in the East Africa Campaign. She arrived too late to assist in the destruction of SMS Königsberg, but she played a successful role in the amphibious landings in German East Africa and the defense of Portuguese Mozambique.

In 1919, the Thistle was ordered back around the Cape of Good Hope to West Africa, but not before her new commanding officer had restored her sailing rig in order to compensate for her damaged engines. Even after her machinery was repaired, the Thistle subsequently retained her sails to supplement her propulsion. She finally arrived back in England for decommissioning in 1925, after an absence of over twenty years in distant waters. By this time, she was the last remaining sailing warship of the Royal Navy.

== Sources ==
- "Thistle", Journal of the American Society of Naval Engineers, 11 (1899), p. 1106
- U.S. Office of Naval Intelligence, Notes on Naval Progress, November 1899 (ONI General Information Series, No. XVIII; Washington, 1899)
- U.S. Office of Naval Intelligence, Notes on Naval Progress, July 1900 (ONI General Information Series, No. XVIII; Washington, 1900)
- T.A. Brassey, ed. The Naval Annual, 1902 (Portsmouth, 1902)
- Watts, Philip; Narbeth, John Harper (1911). "Ship" . In Chisholm, Hugh (ed.). Encyclopædia Britannica. Vol. 24 (11th ed.). Cambridge University Press. pp. 860–922, see pages 891 ff. "§ V. War Vessels"
- Antony Preston and John Major, Send a Gunboat: The Victorian Navy And Supremacy At Sea, 1854–1904 (London 1967, 2007)
- Log books of HMS Bramble: March 1914 to December 1817, January 1918 to October 1919
- Log books of HMS Britomart: January 1917 to March 1920
- Log books of HMS Dwarf: July 1914 to February 1916, September 1920 to September 1923
- Log books of HMS Thistle: March 1914 to December 1916, January 1917 to December 1919, January 1920 to July 1924
