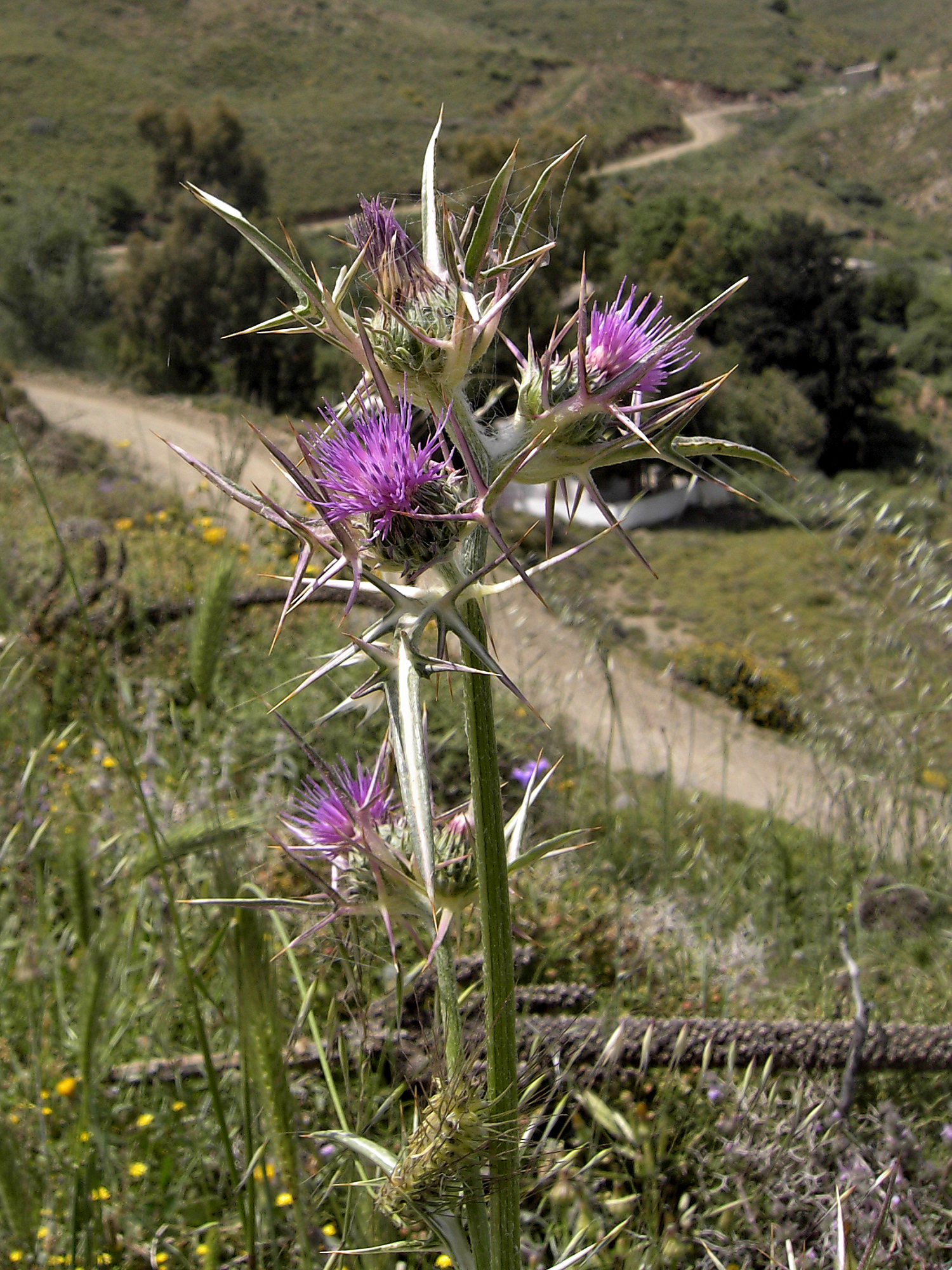
- Notobasis syriaca

Scientific classification
- Kingdom: Plantae
- Clade: Tracheophytes
- Clade: Angiosperms
- Clade: Eudicots
- Clade: Asterids
- Order: Asterales
- Family: Asteraceae
- Subfamily: Carduoideae
- Tribe: Cardueae
- Subtribe: Carduinae
- Genus: Notobasis; Cass.

Type species
- Notobasis syriaca (L.) Cass.

Synonyms
- Polyacantha Gray

= Notobasis =

Genus of flowering plants

Notobasis is a genus in the tribe Cardueae within the family Asteraceae. It is native to the Mediterranean region and the Middle East, from Madeira, the Canary Islands, Morocco and Portugal east to Egypt, Iran and Azerbaijan.

Species

- Notobasis obovallata (M.Bieb. ex Willd.) - Caucasus
- Notobasis syriaca (L.) Cass. - Mediterranean
