= Thistleton (disambiguation) =

Thistleton is a village in Rutland, England.

Thistleton may also refer to:

- Thistleton, Kingston upon Hull, a former place in England
- Thistleton in the parish of Greenhalgh-with-Thistleton, in Fylde, Lancashire, England
- Katie Thistleton (born 1989), Children's BBC television presenter

== See also ==
- Thiselton-Dyer, an English surname
- Thistletown
