= Tiger swallowtail =

Tiger swallowtail is a common name for several species of butterfly, including:

- Papilio appalachiensis or Appalachian tiger swallowtail, endemic to the Appalachians
- Papilio canadensis or Canadian tiger swallowtail, endemic to Canada and the Northern United States
- Papilio glaucus or Eastern tiger swallowtail, endemic to the Eastern United States
- Papilio multicaudata or Two-tailed tiger swallowtail, endemic to Mexico, the Western and Central United States, and south-central Canada
- Papilio rutulus or Western tiger swallowtail, endemic to the Western United States and southwestern Canada
- Papilio solstitius or Midsummer tiger swallowtail, endemic to Northeastern North America
