= Eric Fullerton =

Royal Navy Admiral (1878–1962)

Admiral Sir Eric Fullerton KCB DSO

Commander-in-Chief, Plymouth
- In office 1932–1935

Commander-in-Chief, East Indies Station
- In office December 1929 – 1932

Naval Secretary
- In office April 1927 – December 1929

Commodore, Chatham Naval Barracks
- In office 1923–1926

Captain of the Fleet, Atlantic Fleet
- In office August 1921 – 1923

Commanding Officer, HMS Orion
- In office 1916–1918

Commanding Officer, HMS Mersey
- In office 1914–1916

Personal details
- Born: Eric John Arthur Fullerton; 28 November 1878 Hamble-le-Rice, Hampshire, England
- Died: 9 November 1962 (aged 83) Salisbury, Wiltshire, England
- Awards: Knight Commander of the Order of the Bath; Distinguished Service Order

Military service
- Allegiance: United Kingdom
- Branch/service: Royal Navy
- Years of service: 1892–1936
- Rank: Admiral
- Commands: HMS Orion; East Indies Station; Plymouth Command
- Battles/wars: World War I World War II

Admiral Sir Eric John Arthur Fullerton KCB DSO (28 November 1878 – 9 November 1962) was a Royal Navy officer.

== Naval career ==
Fullerton was the second son of Admiral Sir John Fullerton and entered the Royal Navy himself in 1892 as a cadet in HMS Britannia. He was promoted sub-lieutenant in 1899 and lieutenant in 1900. He specialised as a physical training instructor in early 1903, then joined the new Royal Naval College, Osborne as Inspector of Gymnasia. In 1905 he joined the battleship HMS Renown and in January 1907 transferred to HMS Queen, flagship of the Mediterranean Fleet. In October 1908 he joined the royal yacht, HMY Victoria and Albert, and was promoted commander in 1910. In 1911 he was appointed executive officer of the battleship HMS Triumph in the Mediterranean, and the following year rejoined Osborne.

When the First World War broke out he was given command of the monitor HMS Mersey, which was used for operations off the Belgian coast, and also commanded the squadron consisting of Mersey and its two sister ships, HMS Humber and HMS Severn. He later transferred his command to HMS Severn. In 1915, after he had been promoted captain, his ships completed the destruction of the German cruiser SMS Königsberg in the Rufiji River in German East Africa. For this action he was awarded the Distinguished Service Order (DSO).

In 1916 he took command of the battleship HMS Orion in the Grand Fleet, remaining in command for the remainder of the war. In 1918 he was appointed officer-in-charge of the naval officers taking courses at the University of Cambridge. He was appointed Companion of the Order of the Bath (CB) in the 1920 New Year Honours.

In August 1921 he returned to sea as Captain of the Fleet of the Atlantic Fleet to Admiral Sir Charles Madden and in 1923 he was appointed commodore of the Naval Barracks at Chatham. In May 1926 he was promoted rear-admiral at the relatively early age of 48. In April 1927 he was appointed Naval Secretary and in December 1929 he became Commander-in-Chief of the East Indies Station. He was promoted vice-admiral in 1930. In 1932 he became Commander-in-Chief, Plymouth. He held the post until 1935, in which year he was promoted Admiral, and retired in 1936, although he served with the Royal Naval Reserve during the Second World War. He was appointed Knight Commander of the Order of the Bath (KCB) in 1934.

== Family ==
Fullerton married Dorothy Sybil Fisher, daughter of John Fisher, 1st Baron Fisher, in 1908.

Military offices
Preceded by Frank Larken	Naval Secretary; 1927–1929	Succeeded by George Chetwode
Preceded by Sir Bertram Thesiger	Commander-in-Chief, East Indies Station; 1929–1932	Succeeded by Sir Martin Dunbar-Nasmith
Preceded by Sir Hubert Brand	Commander-in-Chief, Plymouth; 1932–1935	Succeeded by Sir Reginald Plunkett
