= Brazilian ship Javary =

At least three ships of the Brazilian Navy have been named Javary:

- Brazilian monitor Javary (1874), a French-built monitor sunk in the harbor of Rio de Janeiro on 22 November 1893 during the Revolta da Armada, the 1893–94 Naval Revolt
- Brazilian monitor Javary (1913), the British-built lead ship of the Javary class of monitors; refused by the Brazilian Navy because of financial setbacks in the Brazilian economy; purchased by the British Royal Navy after the outbreak of World War I and became HMS Humber, the lead ship of the Humber-class monitors; later converted to a floating crane and remained in use at least to 1938 but probably through the end of World War II
- Brazilian destroyer Javary, launched in 1939; she was purchased while still incomplete by the United Kingdom and renamed HMS Havant
