= Admiral Drury =

Admiral Drury may refer to:

- Byron Drury (1815–1888), British Royal Navy vice admiral
- William O'Bryen Drury (1754–1811), British Royal Navy vice admiral

== See also ==
- Sidney Robert Drury-Lowe (1871–1945), British Royal Navy vice admiral
