= HMS Humber =

Eight ships of the Royal Navy have borne the name HMS Humber, after the Humber, an estuary in eastern England, whilst another was planned:

- HMS Humber (1690) was an 8-gun fireship built in 1690. Her fate is unknown.
- HMS Humber (1693) was an 80-gun second rate ship of the line launched in 1693. She was rebuilt in 1708 and 1726, and was renamed HMS Princess Amelia in 1727. She was broken up in 1752.
- HMS Humber (1748) was a 44-gun fifth rate launched in 1748 and wrecked in 1762.
- HMS Humber (1806) was a 16-gun sloop captured from the French in 1806 and listed until 1808.
- HMS Humber was to have been a Philomel-class wood screw gunvessel. She was laid down in 1861 and cancelled in 1863.
- HMS Humber (1878) was an iron screw storeship purchased in 1878. She had previously been launched for civilian service in 1876 under the name Harar. She was sold back into mercantile service in 1907, being renamed Lucia Victoria.
- HMS Humber (1914) was a Humber-class monitor purchased in 1914. She had previously been launched for the Brazilian Navy in 1913 as the Javary. She was sold for use as a crane ship in 1920.
- HMS Humber was a Ton-class minesweeper launched in 1953, but renamed HMS Bronington in 1959.
- HMS Humber (M2007) was a River-class minesweeper launched in 1984. She was sold to the Brazilian Navy in 1995 and was renamed Amorim Do Valle.

== See also ==
- Two ships named HMS Humberstone
