= Humber River =

There are several rivers in the world called the Humber River:

- Humber (estuary), Yorkshire, England, on the eastern coast
- Humber River (Newfoundland), near Corner Brook in Canada
- Humber River (Ontario), Canada, a major river in Toronto with tributaries throughout the Greater Toronto Area

== See also ==
- Humber (disambiguation)
