= Arthur Lionel Snagge =

Royal Navy officer (1878–1955)

Vice-Admiral Arthur Lionel Snagge CB
- Snagge as a captain c.1927
- Born: 4 May 1878
- Died: 1955 (aged 76–77)
- Burial place: Putney Vale Cemetery
- Spouse(s): Ethel Clara (m. 1905–1924) Gladys Lovett (m. 1933)
- Military career
- Allegiance: United Kingdom
- Branch: Royal Navy
- Service years: 1898–1938
- Rank: Vice-admiral
- Commands: HMS Humber; HMS Glowworm; Danube Flotilla; HMS Ceres; HMS Cumberland; HMS Kent; Royal Naval Barracks, Chatham; Director, Personal Services; Devonport Dockyard
- Conflicts: Second Boer War; First World War; Gallipoli campaign
- Awards: Order of the Nile (Egypt); Distinguished Service Medal (United States)

Vice-Admiral Arthur Lionel Snagge CB (4 May 1878 – 1955) was a Royal Navy officer who was Admiral-Superintendent of Devonport Dockyard.

== Early life ==
Arthur Lionel Snagge was the son of Sir Thomas Snagge, a British judge and justice of the peace, and Maria Frances née Morgan, whose family were from St Petersburg. Snagge was their fourth and youngest son; he also had five sisters. Two of his brothers, Sir Mordaunt Snagge and Sir Harold Snagge, also became judges.

== Naval career ==
Snagge entered the Royal Navy as an acting sub-lieutenant on 15 August 1898, and was confirmed in this rank the following year. On 19 March 1900 he was posted to the gunboat HMS Redbreast. Serving during the Second Boer War, he received the Queen's South Africa Medal. Snagge was promoted to lieutenant on 31 December 1900. In early January 1903, he was formally posted to the signal school at HMS Victory, but the actual posting was for a course of gymnastic instruction at Aldershot. He was promoted to commander on 30 June 1913. Taking command of the newly commissioned monitor HMS Humber in 1914, he served with her throughout most of the First World War in Europe and in the Mediterranean. He was mentioned in dispatches for service in the Eastern Mediterranean December 1915 – January 1916, and the same year received the Order of the Nile, 4th class, from the Sultan of Egypt.

He was appointed British Naval attache to Washington, D.C. in May 1918, promoted to captain on 30 June 1919, and returned in November that year to take a position in the Naval Intelligence Division. For his service in the US during the latter part of the war, he received the Distinguished Service Medal from the United States Army.

Following a series of active commands of various ships in the 1920s, Snagge was appointed Commodore-in-Command of the Royal Naval barracks at Chatham Dockyard in November 1929, serving as such until July 1931. After a staff appointment at the Admiralty, he was on 2 March 1935 appointed Admiral-Superintendent of HM Dockyard Devonport, and served as such until September 1938. He was promoted to vice admiral on 1 January 1936, and placed on the Retired List the following day, but then re-appointed to his post at Devonport.

Snagge was appointed a Companion of the Order of the Bath (CB) in the 1933 Birthday Honours. Snagge died in early 1955 and was buried at Putney Vale Cemetery.

== Personal life ==
Snagge married Ethel Clara at St George's, Hanover Square, on 21 October 1905. They had no children. When he was sent to Washington D.C. as naval attache in June 1918, Ethel was ill and did not go with him. The marriage broke down and they did not live together after this. In 1923, while Snagge was commanding HMS Ceres at Constantinople, he sent a hotel bill to Ethel showing that in January that year he had stayed at a hotel in Bexhill-on-Sea with another woman. This allowed Ethel to divorce him on the grounds of his misconduct, which was completed on 13 March 1924. Snagge married Gladys Lovett, a widow, in 1933.

== Citations ==
Military offices
Preceded by Harold Owen Reinold	Admiral-Superintendent of Devonport Dockyard; 1935–1938	Succeeded by Arthur Ninian Dowding
