= Humber (disambiguation) =

The Humber is a river and large tidal estuary in northern England.

Humber may also refer to:

== Rivers ==
- Humber River (Newfoundland and Labrador), Newfoundland and Labrador, Canada
- Humber River (Toronto), Ontario, Canada

== People ==
- Humber the Hun, a legendary king of the Huns
- Philip Humber, a pitcher in Major League Baseball
- Thomas Humber, founder of the Humber bicycle company

== Vehicles ==
- Humber Limited manufactured cars, commercial vehicles, bicycles and motorcycles
- Humber Light Reconnaissance Car, Humber scout car and Humber Armoured Car, British reconnaissance vehicles during World War II
- Humber cycles
- Humber motorcycles

== Other uses ==
- Humber, Herefordshire, England, UK
- HMS Humber, nine ships of the British Royal Navy
- Humber College, both campuses in Toronto, Ontario, Canada
- Humber Loop, a streetcar loop on the Toronto streetcar system
