= HMS Orion (1910) =

Royal Navy battleship

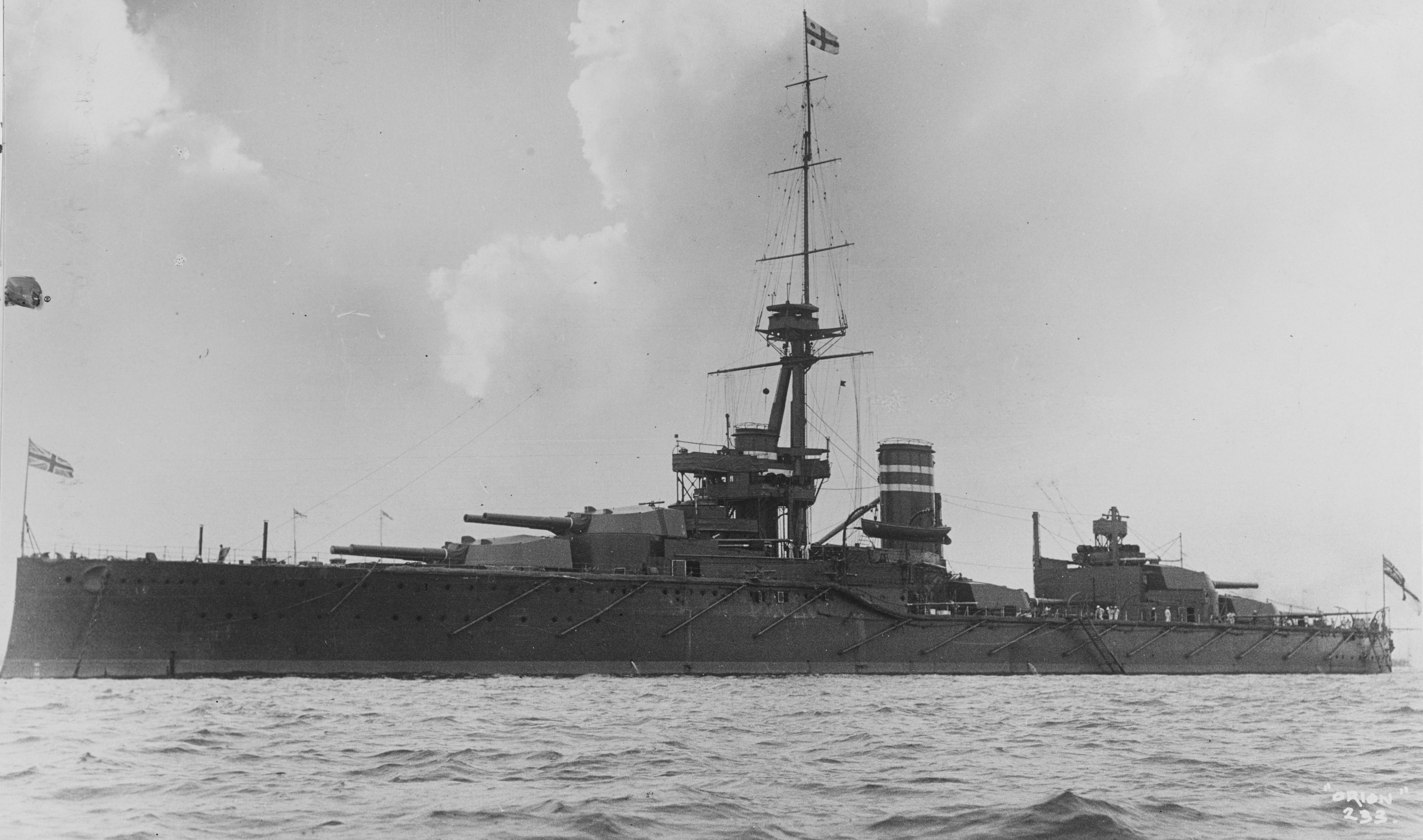
- Orion at anchor, about 1913

History

United Kingdom
- Name: Orion
- Namesake: Mythological hunter Orion
- Builder: HM Dockyard, Portsmouth
- Laid down: 29 November 1909
- Launched: 20 August 1910
- Commissioned: 2 January 1912
- Decommissioned: March 1922
- Out of service: 12 April 1922
- Fate: Sold for scrap, 19 December 1922

General characteristics (as built)
- Class & type: Orion-class dreadnought battleship
- Displacement: 21,922 long tons (22,274 t) (normal)
- Length: 581 ft (177.1 m) (o/a)
- Beam: 88 ft 6 in (27.0 m)
- Draught: 31 ft 3 in (9.5 m)
- Installed power: 27,000 shp (20,000 kW); 18 × Babcock & Wilcox boilers
- Propulsion: 4 × shafts; 2 × steam turbine sets
- Speed: 21 knots (39 km/h; 24 mph)
- Range: 6,730 nmi (12,460 km; 7,740 mi) at 10 knots (19 km/h; 12 mph)
- Complement: 738–1,107 (1916)
- Armament: 5 × twin 13.5-inch (343 mm) guns; 16 × single 4-inch (102 mm) guns; 3 × 21-inch (533 mm) torpedo tubes
- Armour: Belt: 12 in (305 mm); Deck: 1–4 in (25–102 mm); Turrets: 11 in (280 mm); Barbettes: 10 in (254 mm)

HMS Orion was the lead ship of her class of four dreadnought battleships built for the Royal Navy in the early 1910s. She spent the bulk of her career assigned to the Home and Grand Fleets, generally serving as a flagship. Aside from participating in the failed attempt to intercept the German ships that had bombarded Scarborough, Hartlepool and Whitby in late 1914, the Battle of Jutland in May 1916 and the inconclusive action of 19 August, her service during World War I generally consisted of routine patrols and training in the North Sea.

After the Grand Fleet was dissolved in early 1919, Orion was transferred to back to the Home Fleet for a few months before she was assigned to the Reserve Fleet. She served as a gunnery training ship from mid-1921 until she was listed for disposal the following year. The ship was sold for scrap in late 1922 and subsequently broken up.

== Design and description ==
The Orion-class ships were designed in response to the beginnings of the Anglo-German naval arms race and were much larger than their predecessors of the Colossus-class battleship to accommodate larger, more powerful guns and heavier armour. In recognition of these improvements, the class was sometimes called "super-dreadnoughts". The ships had an overall length of 581 feet (177.1 m), a beam of 88 feet 6 inches (27.0 m) and a deep draught of 31 feet 3 inches (9.5 m). They displaced 21,922 long tons (22,274 t) at normal load and 25,596 long tons (26,007 t) at deep load as built; by 1918 Orion's deep displacement had increased to 29,108 long tons (29,575 t). Her crew numbered 754 officers and ratings as of 1914.

The Orion class was powered by two sets of Parsons direct-drive steam turbines, each driving two shafts, using steam provided by 18 Babcock & Wilcox boilers. The turbines were rated at 27,000 shaft horsepower (20,000 kW) and were intended to give the battleships a speed of 21 knots (39 km/h; 24 mph). During her sea trials in September 1911, Orion reached a maximum speed of 21.3 knots (39.4 km/h; 24.5 mph) from 30,552 shp (22,783 kW). The ships carried enough coal and fuel oil to give them a range of 6,730 nautical miles (12,460 km; 7,740 mi) at a cruising speed of 10 knots (19 km/h; 12 mph).

=== Armament and armour ===
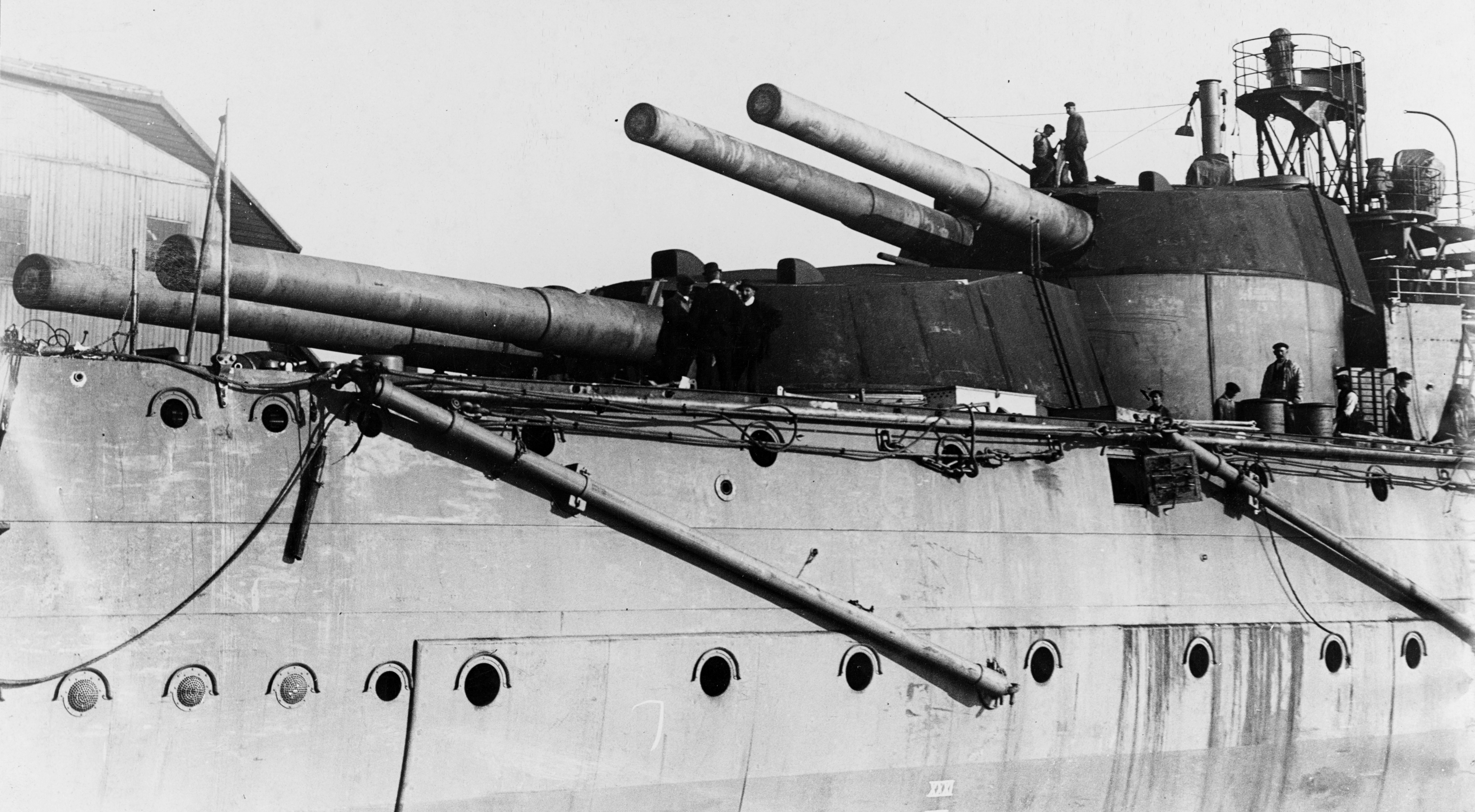
Aft main-gun turrets of Orion, about 1911 while fitting out

The Orion class was equipped with 10 breech-loading (BL) 13.5-inch (343 mm) Mark V guns in five hydraulically powered twin-gun turrets, all on the centreline. The turrets were designated 'A', 'B', 'Q', 'X' and 'Y', from front to rear. Their secondary armament consisted of 16 BL 4-inch (102 mm) Mark VII guns. These guns were split evenly between the forward and aft superstructure, all in single mounts. Four 47 mm (1.9 in) saluting guns were also carried. The ships were equipped with three 21-inch (533 mm) submerged torpedo tubes, one on each broadside and another in the stern, for which 20 torpedoes were provided.

The Orions were protected by a waterline 12-inch (305 mm) armoured belt that extended between the end barbettes. Their decks ranged in thickness between 1 inch (25 mm) and 4 inches with the thickest portions protecting the steering gear in the stern. The main battery turret faces were 11 inches (279 mm) thick, and the turrets were supported by 10-inch-thick (254 mm) barbettes.

=== Modifications ===
In 1914 the shelter-deck guns were enclosed in casemates. By October 1914, a pair of 3-inch (76 mm) anti-aircraft (AA) guns had been added. A fire-control director was installed on a platform below the spotting top in April–May 1915. Additional deck armour was added after the Battle of Jutland in May 1916. Around the same time, three 4-inch guns were removed from the aft superstructure and the ship was modified to operate kite balloons. In mid-to-late 1917, Orion was the only battleship in the Royal Navy to receive a director for her secondary armament. Two flying-off platforms were fitted aboard the ship during 1917–1918; these were mounted on 'B' and 'Q' turret roofs and extended onto the gun barrels. A high-angle rangefinder was fitted in the forward superstructure by 1921.

== Construction and career ==
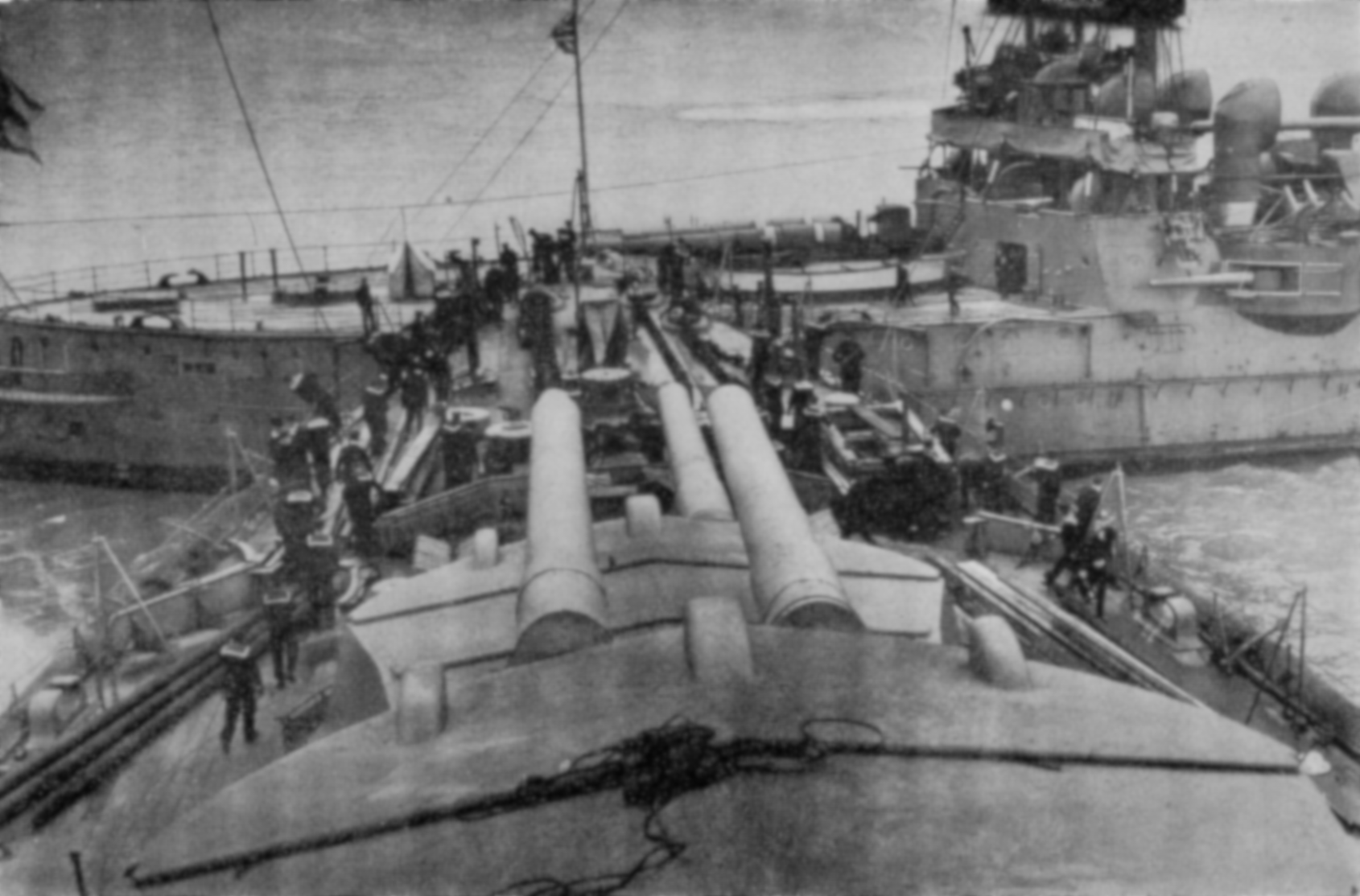
Revenge stuck on Orion's bow, 7 January 1912

Orion, named after the mythological hunter, Orion, was the fourth ship of her name to serve in the Royal Navy (RN). The ship was laid down at HM Dockyard, Portsmouth on 29 November 1909. She was launched on 20 August 1910, and was commissioned on 2 January 1912. Including her armament, her cost is variously quoted at £1,855,917 or £1,918,773. Orion was assigned to the 2nd division of the Home Fleet as the flagship of Rear-Admiral Sir Herbert King-Hall, the division's second-in-command. The ship was slightly damaged on 7 January when the pre-dreadnought battleship Revenge broke loose from her moorings and collided with Orion's bow. The division was redesignated as the 2nd Battle Squadron (BS) on 1 May. The ship, (Note: Burt gives no account of Orion's activities between January 1912 and May 1916. This article assumes that the ship participated in the activities of the 2nd BS as Burt notes for Monarch.) together with her sister ships Thunderer and Monarch, participated in the Parliamentary Naval Review on 9 July at Spithead. They then participated in training manoeuvres. King-Hall was relieved by Rear-Admiral Rosslyn Wemyss on 29 October. On 13 November, the ship participated in comparative gunnery trials with Thunderer to evaluate the effectiveness of the latter's gunnery director. Thunderer decisively outshot Orion, although some of her success was because her director was above the smoke that obscured the target from Orion's guns. The test was repeated in better conditions on 4 December and Orion performed much better, apparently beating Thunderer. The three sisters were present with the 2nd BS to receive the President of France, Raymond Poincaré, at Spithead on 24 June 1913 and then participated in the annual fleet manoeuvres in August. Wemyss was relieved in his turn by Rear-Admiral Sir Robert Arbuthnot, 4th Baronet on 28 October. Captain Frederic Dreyer assumed command of Orion that same day. On 4 November, Orion, Thunderer, the dreadnought King George V and the predreadnought King Edward VII fired at and sank the target ship Empress of India to give their crews experience in firing live ammunition against a real ship.

=== World War I ===
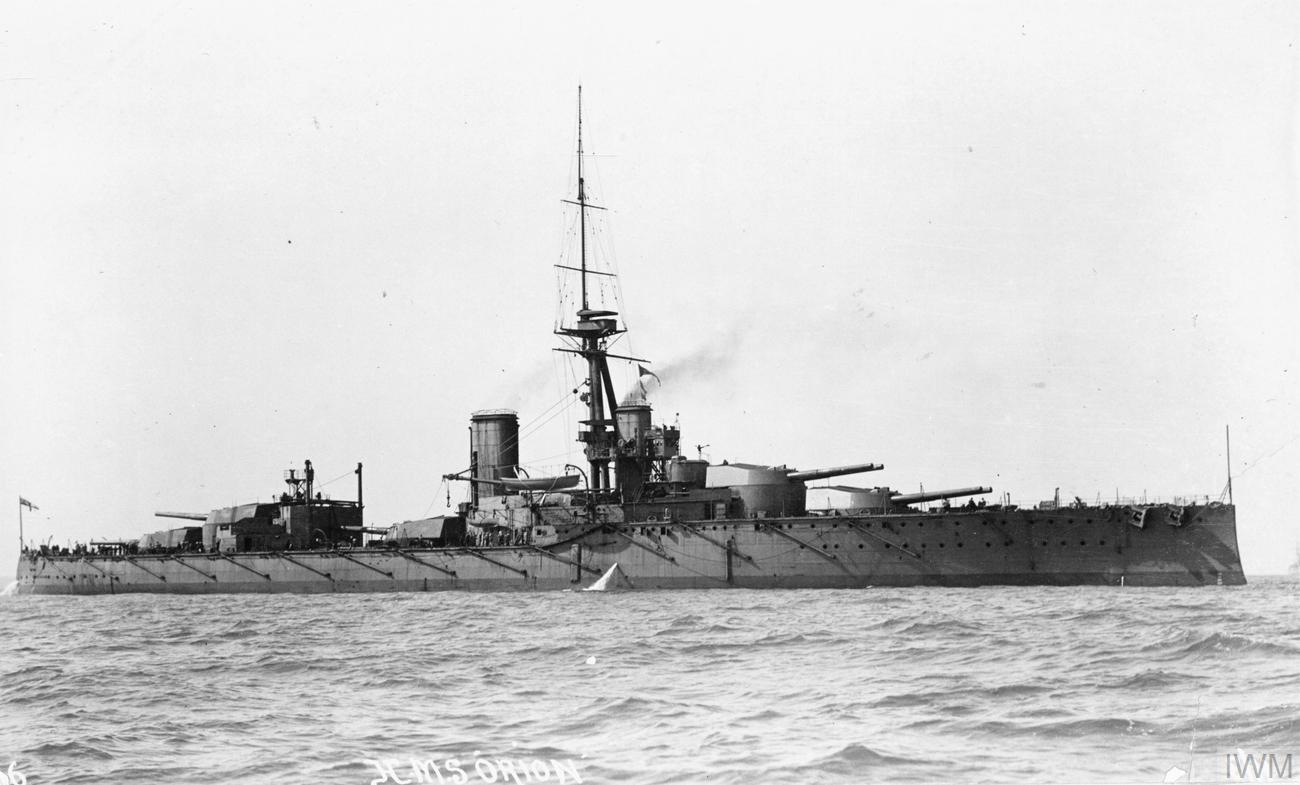
Orion at anchor before 1915

Between 17 and 20 July 1914, Orion took part in a test mobilisation and fleet review as part of the British response to the July Crisis. Arriving in Portland on 25 July, she was ordered to proceed with the rest of the Home Fleet to Scapa Flow four days later to safeguard the fleet from a possible surprise attack by the Imperial German Navy. In August 1914, following the outbreak of World War I, the Home Fleet was reorganised as the Grand Fleet, and placed under the command of Admiral Sir John Jellicoe. On 8 August, Orion was towing a target for the dreadnought Ajax and Monarch when the latter reported that she had been unsuccessfully attacked by a torpedo and the gunnery exercise was terminated. Almost two weeks later, the ship began having serious problems with her condensers and Jellicoe ordered that they be retubed while she was detached to the coaling base at Loch Ewe, on the northwest coast of Scotland. Orion rejoined the Grand Fleet on 9 September. Repeated reports of submarines in Scapa Flow led Jellicoe to conclude that the defences there were inadequate and he ordered that the Grand Fleet be dispersed to other bases until the defences be reinforced. On 16 October the 2nd BS was sent to Loch na Keal on the western coast of Scotland. The squadron departed for gunnery practice off the northern coast of Ireland on the morning of 27 October and the dreadnought Audacious struck a mine, laid a few days earlier by the German armed merchant cruiser SS Berlin. Thinking that the ship had been torpedoed by a submarine, the other dreadnoughts were ordered away from the area, while smaller ships rendered assistance. Shortly afterwards, Orion had to be sent to Greenock for repairs to her turbine mounts.

==== Bombardment of Scarborough, Hartlepool, and Whitby ====
The Royal Navy's Room 40 had intercepted and decrypted German radio traffic containing plans for a German attack on Scarborough, Hartlepool and Whitby in mid-December using the four battlecruisers of Konteradmiral (Rear-Admiral) Franz von Hipper's I Scouting Group. The radio messages did not mention that the High Seas Fleet with fourteen dreadnoughts and eight predreadnoughts would reinforce Hipper. The ships of both sides departed their bases on 15 December, with the British intending to ambush the German ships on their return voyage. They mustered the six dreadnoughts of Vice-Admiral Sir George Warrender's 2nd BS, including Orion and her sisters, Monarch and Conqueror, and the four battlecruisers of Vice-Admiral Sir David Beatty.

The screening forces of each side blundered into each other during the early morning darkness and heavy weather of 16 December. The Germans got the better of the initial exchange of fire, severely damaging several British destroyers, but Admiral Friedrich von Ingenohl, commander of the High Seas Fleet, ordered his ships to turn away, concerned about the possibility of a massed attack by British destroyers in the dawn's light. A series of miscommunications and mistakes by the British allowed Hipper's ships to avoid an engagement with Beatty's forces. One of these occurred when Orion's lookouts spotted the light cruiser SMS Stralsund and failed to engage because Arbuthnot refused to allow the ship to open fire without a command from Warrender.

==== 1915–1916 ====
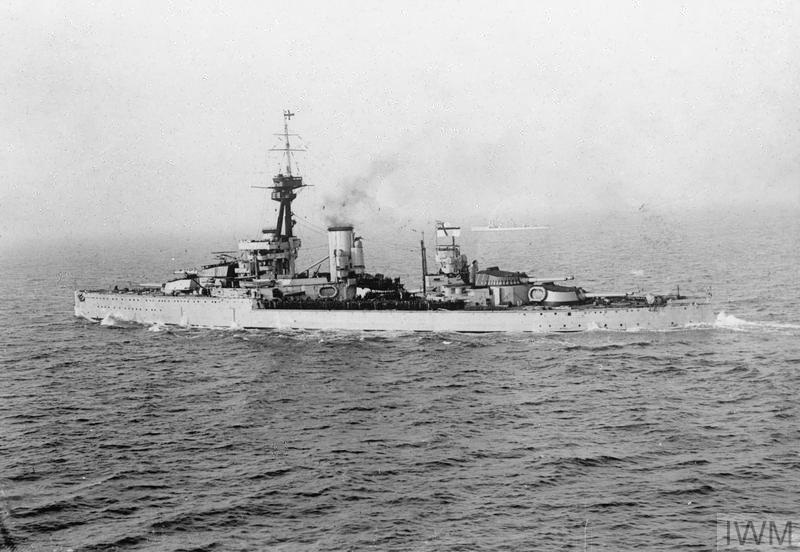
Aerial view of an Orion-class battleship, probably Orion herself, under way after May 1915 as the gunnery director is visible under her spotting top and her torpedo net booms have been removed.

Jellicoe's ships, including Orion, conducted gunnery drills on 10–13 January 1915 west of Orkney and the Shetland Islands. Rear-Admiral Arthur Leveson relieved Arbuthnot on 15 January. On the evening of 23 January, the bulk of the Grand Fleet sailed in support of Beatty's battlecruisers, but Orion and the rest of the fleet did not participate in the ensuing Battle of Dogger Bank the following day. On 7–10 March, the Grand Fleet conducted a sweep in the northern North Sea, during which it conducted training manoeuvres. Another such cruise took place on 16–19 March. On 11 April, the Grand Fleet conducted a patrol in the central North Sea and returned to port on 14 April; another patrol in the area took place on 17–19 April, followed by gunnery drills off Shetland on 20–21 April. Orion was given a brief refit in late April in Devonport.

The Grand Fleet conducted sweeps into the central North Sea on 17–19 May and 29–31 May without encountering any German vessels. During 11–14 June, the fleet conducted gunnery practice and battle exercises west of Shetland and more training off Shetland beginning on 11 July. The 2nd BS conducted gunnery practice in the Moray Firth on 2 August and then returned to Scapa Flow. On 2–5 September, the fleet went on another cruise in the northern end of the North Sea and conducted gunnery drills. Throughout the rest of the month, the Grand Fleet conducted numerous training exercises. The ship, together with the majority of the Grand Fleet, conducted another sweep into the North Sea from 13 to 15 October. Almost three weeks later, Orion participated in another fleet training operation west of Orkney during 2–5 November and repeated the exercise at the beginning of December.

The Grand Fleet sortied in response to an attack by German ships on British light forces near Dogger Bank on 10 February 1916, but it was recalled two days later when it became clear that no German ships larger than a destroyer were involved. The fleet departed for a cruise in the North Sea on 26 February; Jellicoe had intended to use the Harwich Force to sweep the Heligoland Bight, but bad weather prevented operations in the southern North Sea. As a result, the operation was confined to the northern end of the sea. Another sweep began on 6 March, but had to be abandoned the following day as the weather grew too severe for the escorting destroyers. On the night of 25 March, Orion and the rest of the fleet sailed from Scapa Flow to support Beatty's battlecruisers and other light forces raiding the German Zeppelin base at Tondern. By the time the Grand Fleet approached the area on 26 March, the British and German forces had already disengaged and a strong gale threatened the light craft, so the fleet was ordered to return to base. On 21 April, the Grand Fleet conducted a demonstration off Horns Reef to distract the Germans while the Imperial Russian Navy relaid its defensive minefields in the Baltic Sea. The fleet returned to Scapa Flow on 24 April and refuelled before proceeding south in response to intelligence reports that the Germans were about to launch a raid on Lowestoft, but only arrived in the area after the Germans had withdrawn. On 2–4 May, the fleet conducted another demonstration off Horns Reef to keep German attention focused on the North Sea.

==== Battle of Jutland ====
Maps showing the manoeuvres of the British (blue) and German (red) fleets on 31 May – 1 June 1916

In an attempt to lure out and destroy a portion of the Grand Fleet, the High Seas Fleet, composed of sixteen dreadnoughts, six pre-dreadnoughts and supporting ships, departed the Jade Bight early on the morning of 31 May. The fleet sailed in concert with Hipper's five battlecruisers. Room 40 had intercepted and decrypted German radio traffic containing plans of the operation. In response the Admiralty ordered the Grand Fleet, totalling some 28 dreadnoughts and 9 battlecruisers, to sortie the night before to cut off and destroy the High Seas Fleet.

On 31 May, Orion, under the command of Captain Oliver Backhouse, was the lead ship of the 2nd Division of the 2nd BS and was the fifth ship from the head of the battle line after deployment. During the first stage of the general engagement, the ship fired four salvos of armour-piercing, capped (APC) shells from her main guns at the battleship SMS Markgraf at 18:32, scoring one hit that knocked out a 15-centimetre (5.9 in) gun and killed or disabled its crew. (Note: The times used in this section are in UT, which is one hour behind CET, which is often used in German works.) About 19:15, she engaged the battlecruiser SMS Lützow at a range of 18,700–19,800 yards (17,100–18,100 m) with six salvos of APC shells and claimed to straddle her with the last two salvos. These last salvos were actually fired at the destroyer SMS G38 which was screening the battlecruiser and laying a smoke screen. Lützow was also fired at by Monarch during this time and was hit five times between the sisters. They knocked out two of her main guns, temporarily knocked out the power to the sternmost turret as well as causing a fair amount of flooding. This was the last time that Orion fired her guns during the battle, having expended a total of fifty-one 13.5-inch APC shells.

==== Subsequent activity ====
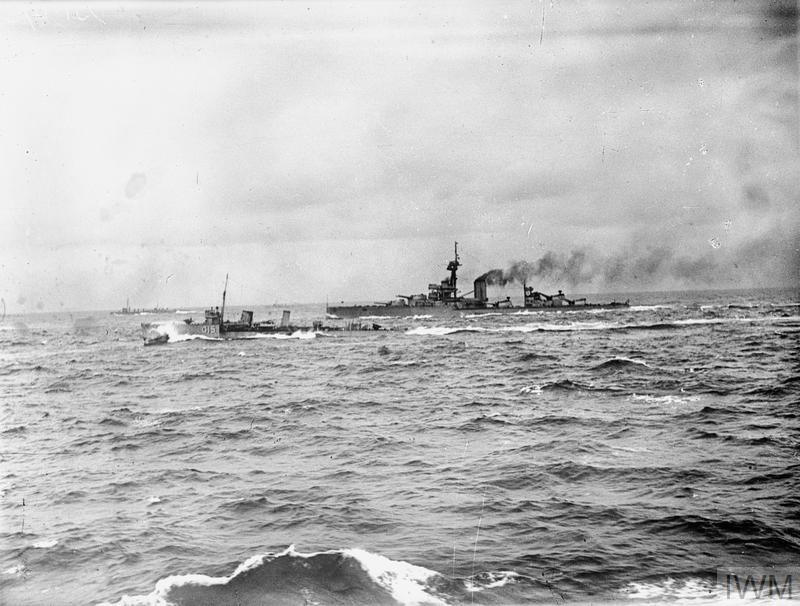
Orion and the destroyer Musketeer under way, 1918

The Grand Fleet sortied on 18 August to ambush the High Seas Fleet while it advanced into the southern North Sea, but a series of miscommunications and mistakes prevented Jellicoe from intercepting the German fleet before it returned to port. Two light cruisers were sunk by German U-boats during the operation, prompting Jellicoe to decide to not risk the major units of the fleet south of 55° 30' North due to the prevalence of German submarines and mines. The Admiralty concurred and stipulated that the Grand Fleet would not sortie unless the German fleet was attempting an invasion of Britain or there was a strong possibility it could be forced into an engagement under suitable conditions. Rear-Admiral William Goodenough assumed command of the division on 5 December and Captain Eric Fullerton relieved Backhouse on the 14th.

In April 1918, the High Seas Fleet again sortied, to attack British convoys to Norway. They enforced strict wireless silence during the operation, which prevented Room 40 cryptanalysts from warning the new commander of the Grand Fleet, Admiral Beatty. The British only learned of the operation after an accident aboard the battlecruiser SMS Moltke forced her to break radio silence to inform the German commander of her condition. Beatty then ordered the Grand Fleet to sea to intercept the Germans, but he was not able to reach the High Seas Fleet before it turned back for Germany. The ship was present at Rosyth, Scotland, when the High Seas Fleet surrendered there on 21 November and she remained part of the 2nd BS through 1 March 1919.

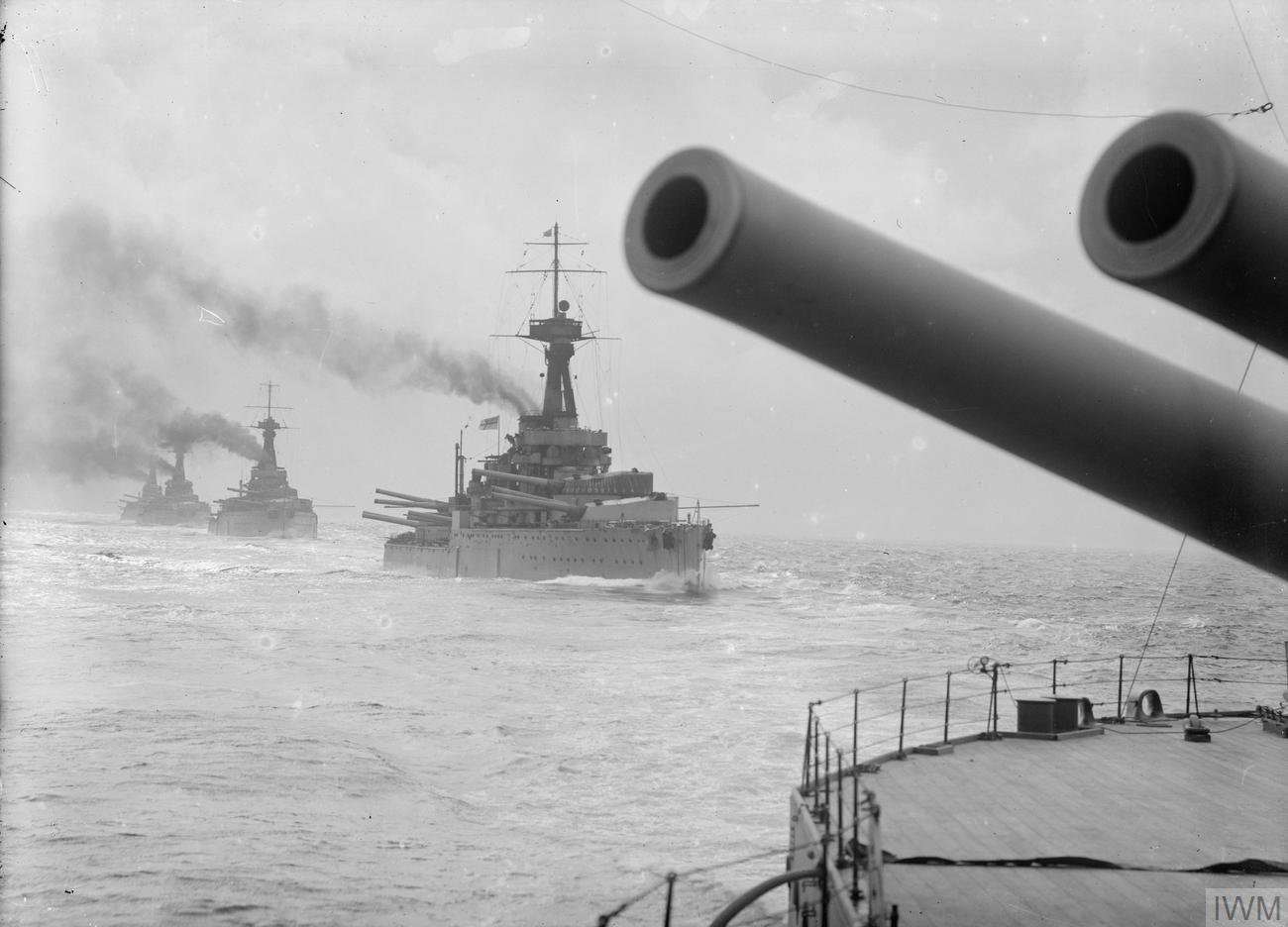
The four Orion-class battleships in line ahead formation, after 1915

By 1 May, Orion had been assigned to the 3rd BS of the Home Fleet and was serving as the flagship for Rear-Admiral Sir Douglas Nicholson, second-in-command of the squadron. On 1 November, the 3rd BS was disbanded and Orion was transferred to the Reserve Fleet at Portland, together with her sisters. Nicholson still hoisted his flag aboard her, although he was now commander of the Reserve Fleet there. Nicholson hauled down his flag on 1 April 1920 and the ship was transferred back to Portsmouth by 14 September. Orion then became the flagship of the Reserve Fleet, which was commanded by Vice-Admiral Richard Phillimore. In June 1921 she became a gunnery training ship at Portland. On 12 April 1922, she was paid off and placed on the disposal list in accordance with the terms of the Washington Naval Treaty. On 19 December Orion was sold for scrap to Cox and Danks and she arrived at Upnor in February 1923 to begin demolition.

== Bibliography ==
- Brooks, John (1996). "Percy Scott and the Director". In McLean, David; Preston, Antony (eds.). Warship 1996. London: Conway Maritime Press. pp. 150–170. ISBN 0-85177-685-X.
- Brown, David K. (1999). The Grand Fleet: Warship Design and Development 1906–1922. Annapolis, Maryland: Naval Institute Press. ISBN 1-55750-315-X.
- Burt, R. A. (1986). British Battleships of World War One. Annapolis, Maryland: Naval Institute Press. ISBN 0-87021-863-8.
- Campbell, N. J. M. (1986). Jutland: An Analysis of the Fighting. Annapolis, Maryland: Naval Institute Press. ISBN 0-87021-324-5.
- Colledge, J. J.; Warlow, Ben (2006) [1969]. Ships of the Royal Navy: The Complete Record of All Fighting Ships of the Royal Navy from the 15th Century to the Present (3rd Rev ed.). London: Chatham Publishing. ISBN 978-1-86176-281-8. OCLC 67375475.
- Corbett, Julian (1997) [1940]. Naval Operations. History of the Great War: Based on Official Documents. Vol. III (Second ed.). London and Nashville, Tennessee: Imperial War Museum in association with the Battery Press. ISBN 1-870423-50-X.
- Friedman, Norman (2015). The British Battleship 1906–1946. Barnsley, UK: Seaforth Publishing. ISBN 978-1-84832-225-7.
- Goldrick, James (2015). Before Jutland: The Naval War in Northern European Waters, August 1914–February 1915. Annapolis, Maryland: Naval Institute Press. ISBN 978-1-59114-349-9.
- Halpern, Paul G. (1995). A Naval History of World War I. Annapolis, Maryland: Naval Institute Press. ISBN 1-55750-352-4.
- Jellicoe, John (1919). The Grand Fleet, 1914–1916: Its Creation, Development, and Work. New York: George H. Doran Company. OCLC 13614571.
- Massie, Robert K. (2003). Castles of Steel: Britain, Germany, and the Winning of the Great War at Sea. New York: Random House. ISBN 0-679-45671-6.
- Parkes, Oscar (1990) [1966]. British Battleships, Warrior 1860 to Vanguard 1950: A History of Design, Construction, and Armament (New & rev. ed.). Annapolis, Maryland: Naval Institute Press. ISBN 1-55750-075-4.
- Preston, Antony (1985). "Great Britain and Empire Forces". In Gray, Randal (ed.). Conway's All the World's Fighting Ships 1906–1921. Annapolis, Maryland: Naval Institute Press. pp. 1–104. ISBN 0-85177-245-5.
- Silverstone, Paul H. (1984). Directory of the World's Capital Ships. New York: Hippocrene Books. ISBN 0-88254-979-0.
- Tarrant, V. E. (1999) [1995]. Jutland: The German Perspective: A New View of the Great Battle, 31 May 1916. London: Brockhampton Press. ISBN 1-86019-917-8.
