= Sidney Robert Drury-Lowe =

Royal Navy admiral

Vice-Admiral Sidney Robert Drury-Lowe CMG
- Drury-Lowe in 1917
- Born: 19 October 1871; United Kingdom
- Died: 24 January 1945 (aged 73); St Annes-on-Sea, England, United Kingdom
- Military career
- Allegiance: United Kingdom
- Branch: Royal Navy
- Service years: 1891–1925
- Rank: Vice-Admiral
- Commands: HMS Chatham; HMS Zealandia; HMS Princess Royal; HMS Superb; HMS Monarch
- Conflicts: World War I; East African campaign; Battle of Rufiji Delta

Vice-Admiral Sidney Robert Drury-Lowe CMG (19 October 1871 – 24 January 1945) was a British Royal Navy officer. He is known for trapping and sinking the SMS Königsberg in the Battle of Rufiji Delta in the East African Campaign of World War I.

== Biography ==
Drury-Lowe was born on 19 October 1871 in the United Kingdom.

He began his military service as a Sub-Lieutenant on 14 May 1891 and was promoted to Lieutenant in 1892. In April 1900 he was appointed in command of the gunboat HMS Kite. In 1902 he was posted to the Admiralty as assistant to the Director of Naval Ordnance, and participated in armor and shell experiments on HMS Belleisle. He was promoted to commander on 31 December 1902, and served in British Somaliland 1903–04. He was then second in command of the Portsmouth naval barracks, but was suspended from his post for "disturbances" in the barracks in 1906. Drury-Lowe married Clare Susan Charteris in 1909 and had a daughter, Pamela Jocelyn, who was born in 1911.

He was again promoted to captain on 30 June 1909. In 1912, Drury-Lowe took command of the light cruiser HMS Chatham and would command it during the East African Campaign of World War I. There he trapped the SMS Königsberg and eventually sank it. On 23 November, he was injured in his foot after exiting a boat in a seaway and temporarily transferred command to Raymond Fitzmaurice.

Drury-Lowe became commander of HMS Zealandia on 14 September 1916. He temporarily went on to command HMS Princess Royal from 9 October 1917, and handed it back to John Donald Kelly three months later. Finally, he was named commander of HMS Superb on 2 February 1918. He became president of the Committee of Fire Control Tables from August 39, 1919, until 10 December 1920. Drury-Lowe was promoted to Rear-Admiral on 19 February 1920 and promoted to Vice-Admiral after his retirement on 12 August 1925. He died from heart failure on 24 January 1945 at St Annes-on-Sea and was cremated on 26 January.
