= HMS Chatham (1911) =

Town-class light cruiser

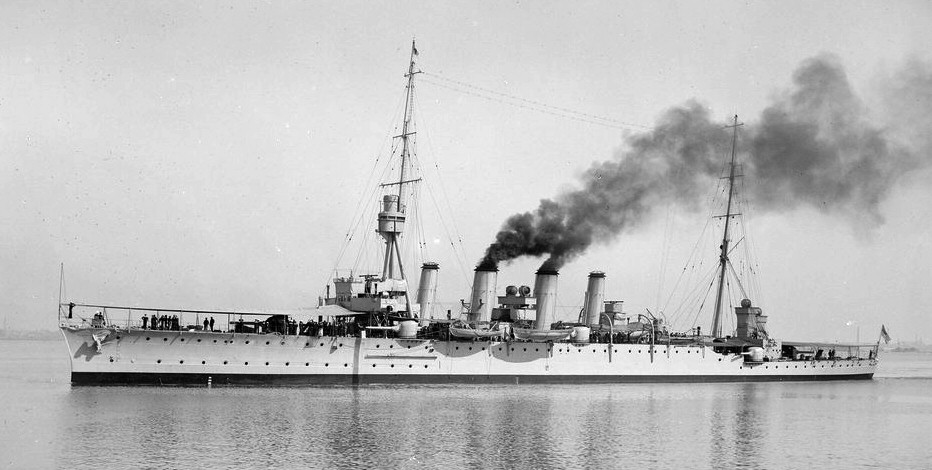

History

United Kingdom
- Name: Chatham
- Namesake: Chatham, Kent
- Builder: Chatham Dockyard
- Laid down: 3 January 1911
- Launched: 9 November 1911
- Commissioned: December 1912
- Fate: Sold for scrap, 13 July 1926

General characteristics (as built)
- Class & type: Town-class light cruiser
- Displacement: 5,400 long tons (5,487 t)
- Length: 430 ft (131.1 m) p/p; 457 ft (139.3 m) o/a
- Beam: 49 ft (14.9 m)
- Draught: 16 ft (4.9 m) (mean)
- Installed power: 12 × Yarrow boilers; 25,000 shp (19,000 kW)
- Propulsion: 4 × shafts; 3 × steam turbines
- Speed: 25.5 knots (47.2 km/h; 29.3 mph)
- Range: 4,460 nmi (8,260 km; 5,130 mi) at 10 knots (19 km/h; 12 mph)
- Complement: 475
- Armament: 8 × single 6 in (152 mm) guns; 4 × single 3 pdr (47 mm (1.9 in)) guns; 2 × 21 in (533 mm) torpedo tubes
- Armour: Waterline belt: 2 in (51 mm); Deck: .375–1.5 in (9.5–38.1 mm); Conning Tower: 4 in (102 mm)

HMS Chatham was a Town-class light cruiser built for the Royal Navy in the 1910s. She was the name ship of her sub-class of the Town class. The ship survived the First World War and was sold for scrap in 1926.

== Design and description ==
The Chatham sub-class were slightly larger and improved versions of the preceding Weymouth sub-class. They were 457 feet (139.3 m) long overall, with a beam of 49 feet (14.9 m) and a draught of 16 feet (4.9 m). Displacement was 5,400 long tons (5,500 t) normal and 6,000 long tons (6,100 t) at full load. Twelve Yarrow boilers fed Chatham's Parsons steam turbines, driving four propeller shafts, that were rated at 25,000 shaft horsepower (19,000 kW) for a design speed of 25.5 knots (47.2 km/h; 29.3 mph). The ship reached 26.1 knots (48.3 km/h; 30.0 mph) during her sea trials from 26,247 shp (19,572 kW). The boilers used both fuel oil and coal, with 1,200 long tons (1,219 t) of coal and 260 long tons (264 t) tons of oil carried, which gave a range of 4,460 nautical miles (8,260 km; 5,130 mi) at 10 knots (19 km/h; 12 mph).

The main armament of the Chathams was eight BL 6-inch (152 mm) Mk XI guns. Two of these guns were mounted on the centreline fore and aft of the superstructure and two more were mounted on the forecastle deck abreast the bridge. The remaining four guns amidships were raised to the extended forecastle deck, which meant that they could be worked in all weathers. All these guns were fitted with gun shields. Four Vickers 3-pounder (47 mm) saluting guns were also fitted. The armament was completed by two submerged 21-inch (533 mm) torpedo tubes.

== Construction and career ==
The ship was laid down on 3 January 1911 by Chatham Royal Dockyard and launched on 6 November. Upon completion in December 1912, Chatham was assigned to the 2nd Battle Squadron and was transferred to the 2nd Light Cruiser Squadron in the Mediterranean in July 1913.

Chatham remained part of the Mediterranean Fleet at the outbreak of the First World War, and was initially employed in the search for the German battlecruiser Goeben and cruiser Breslau, searching the Straits of Messina on 3 August. After the two German ships avoided the British forces and reached Turkey, Chatham was detached for operations in the Red Sea on 13 August 1914.

On 20 September that year, the German light cruiser Königsberg sank the old British cruiser Pegasus in Zanzibar harbour. In response, Chatham was ordered to East Africa to join up with sister ships Weymouth and Dartmouth and take part in the hunt for Königsberg, with Chatham's Captain, Sidney Robert Drury-Lowe commanding the operation. Chatham arrived at Zanzibar on 28 September, but her participation in the search was delayed when, during the night of 1 October, cruising off Mombasa, she ran aground on the Leven Reef, just to the northward of the entrance to Kilindini Harbour. While Chatham was only lightly damaged, she was under repair at Mombasa from 3 October to 15 October.

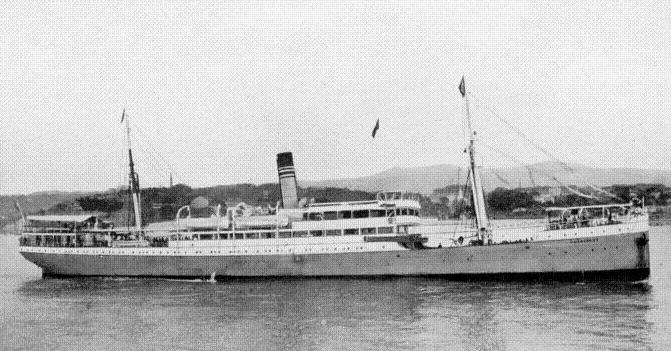
Präsident

On 19 October Chatham's boats found the German steamer Präsident 3.5 miles (5.6 km) upriver from the coastal town of Lindi, German East Africa (now Tanzania). While the Germans claimed that Präsident was a hospital ship, the British found no medical equipment on board and had not been notified of the German ship's status and found documents aboard Präsident indicating that she had acted as a supply ship for Königsberg. The German ship was claimed as a Prize of war, but as Präsident's engines were broken down, Chatham permanently disabled Präsident's machinery before continuing the search for Königsberg.

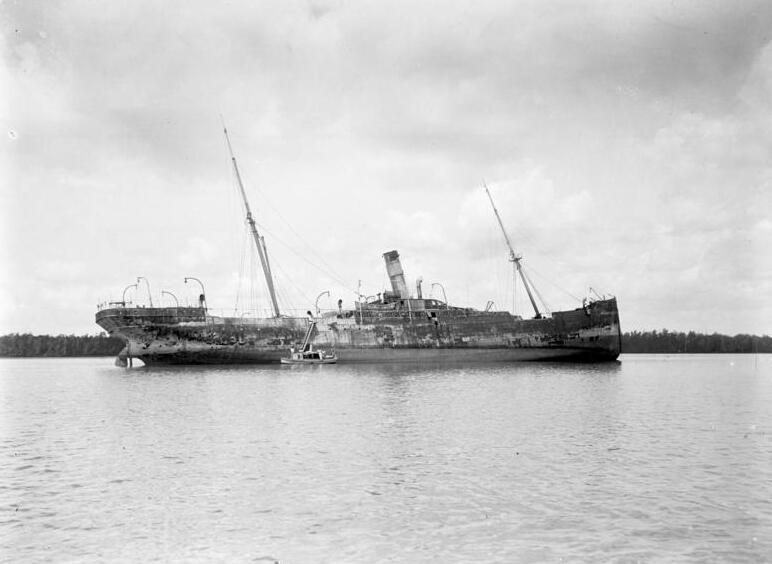
Somali after being burnt out by shellfire from Chatham.

On 30 October Chatham found Königsberg and the supply ship Somali up the Rufiji River, but owing to the shallowness of the river delta, could not closely approach the two German ships. On 7 November Chatham hit Somali with a shell, causing a fire that destroyed the supply ship, while on 10 November the British scuttled the collier Newbridge in the main channel of the Delta, blocking Königsberg from escaping to sea. Chatham left East African waters on 2 January 1915 for the Mediterranean.

From May 1915 Chatham supported the Allied landings at Gallipoli. On 12–13 July 1915 she provided gunfire support to an attack along the Achi Baba Nullah dry water course on Cape Helles, and on 6–7 August took part in the Landing at Suvla Bay, acting as the flagship of Rear-Admiral John de Robeck, in command of Naval Forces during the operation. On 20 December Chatham acted as the flagship for Admiral Weymss during the evacuation from Suvla Bay and Anzac Cove.

In 1916 she returned to home waters and joined the 3rd Light Cruiser Squadron of the Grand Fleet. On 26 May 1916, Chatham struck a mine off the Norfolk coast and had to be towed to Chatham for repairs. The ship was placed in reserve in 1918. After the war, Chatham was lent to the New Zealand Division of the Royal Navy from 1920 to 1924, She proceeded via the Royal Naval Dockyard in the Imperial fortress colony of Bermuda (home base of the 8th Cruiser Squadron on the North America and West Indies Station), before cruising to the West Indies and becoming the first Royal Naval vessel from Bermuda to pass through the Panama Canal in December, 1920 (the geographic limits of the station controlled from Bermuda had grown over the preceding century from the western North Atlantic to absorb the area of the Jamaica Station, and following the first World War would absorb the former areas of the South East Coast of America Station and, utilising the canal, the Pacific Station, demonstrating the amity and the convergence of national interests between the United Kingdom and the United States). During late June 1921, she carried out a search for the missing steamer SS Canastota.

She was sold for scrapping on 13 July 1926 to Thos. W. Ward, of Pembroke Dock.

In 1922, the crew of Chatham donated a cup to the New Zealand Football Association. This became the Chatham Cup, New Zealand's local equivalent of the FA Cup, and its premier knockout football trophy.

== Bibliography ==
- Colledge, J. J.; Warlow, Ben & Bush, Steve (2020). Ships of the Royal Navy: The Complete Record of all Fighting Ships of the Royal Navy from the 15th Century to the Present (5th revised and updated ed.). Seaforth Publishing. ISBN 978-1-5267-9327-0.
- Corbett, Julian. Naval Operations to the Battle of the Falklands. History of the Great War: Based on Official Documents. Vol. I (2nd ed.). Imperial War Museum and Battery Press. ISBN 0-89839-256-X.
- Corbett, Julian (1997) [1929]. Naval Operations. History of the Great War: Based on Official Documents. Vol. II (Second ed.). Imperial War Museum in association with the Battery Press. ISBN 1-870423-74-7.
- Corbett, Julian (1923). Naval Operations: Vol. III. History of the Great War: Based on Official Documents. Longmans, Green & Co.
- Friedman, Norman (2010). British Cruisers: Two World Wars and After. Naval Institute Press. ISBN 978-1-59114-078-8.
- Lyon, David (1977). "The First Town Class 1908–31: Part 1". Warship. 1 (1). Conway Maritime Press: 48–58. ISBN 0-85177-132-7.
- Lyon, David (1977). "The First Town Class 1908–31: Part 2". Warship. 1 (2). Conway Maritime Press: 54–61. ISBN 0-85177-132-7.
- Lyon, David (1977). "The First Town Class 1908–31: Part 3". Warship. 1 (3). Conway Maritime Press: 46–51. ISBN 0-85177-132-7.
- Monograph No. 10.—East Africa to July 1915 (PDF). Naval Staff Monographs (Historical). Vol. II. The Naval Staff, Training and Staff Duties Division. 1921. pp. 2–148.
- Monograph No. 21: The Mediterranean 1914–1915 (PDF). Naval Staff Monographs (Historical). Vol. VIII. The Naval Staff, Training and Staff Duties Division. 1923.
- "Narrative of Proceedings of H.M.S. Chatham: Off East Coast of Africa in Search of German Light Cruiser Köningsberg". The Naval Review. 3 (3): 471–487. 1915.
- Newbolt, Henry (1996) [1931]. Naval Operations. History of the Great War Based on Official Documents. Vol. V. Battery Press. ISBN 0-89839-255-1.
- Preston, Antony (1985). "Great Britain and Empire Forces". In Gray, Randal (ed.). Conway's All the World's Fighting Ships 1906–1921. Naval Institute Press. pp. 1–104. ISBN 0-85177-245-5.
