= HMS Severn (1914) =

British Navy warship

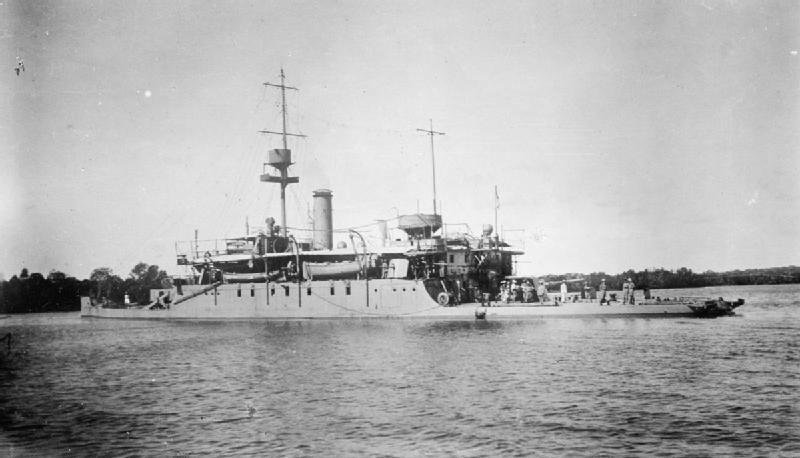
- HMS Severn

History

Brazil
- Name: Solimoes
- Builder: Vickers
- Laid down: 24 August 1912
- Launched: 19 August 1913
- Out of service: 8 August 1914
- Fate: Sold to the United Kingdom

United Kingdom
- Name: HMS Severn
- Acquired: 8 August 1914
- Honours and awards: Battle of the Yser 1914–1915; SMS Königsberg 1915
- Fate: Sold 9 May 1921 for scrapping

General characteristics
- Class & type: Humber-class monitor
- Displacement: 1,260 long tons (1,280 t)
- Length: 266 ft 9 in (81.3 m)
- Beam: 49 ft (14.9 m)
- Draught: 5 ft 7.2 in (1.7 m)
- Installed power: 1,450 ihp (1,080 kW)
- Propulsion: 2 × triple expansion engines; 2 × Yarrow boilers; 2 × screws
- Speed: 12 kn (22 km/h; 14 mph) (design); 9.5 kn (18 km/h; 11 mph) (in service)
- Armament: 2 × 6 in (152 mm) guns; 2 × 4.7 in (119 mm) dual-purpose guns; 4 × 3-pounder guns; 1 × 3-pounder anti-aircraft gun
- Armour: Belt: 3–1.5 in (76–38 mm); Bulkheads: 1.5 in (38 mm); Barbette: 3.5 in (89 mm); Turret Face: 4 inches (102 mm)

HMS Severn was a Humber-class monitor of the Royal Navy. Originally built by Vickers for Brazil, she was purchased by the Royal Navy in 1914 on the outbreak of the First World War along with her sister ships Humber and Mersey. She had been christened Solimoes by the Brazilians, but was renamed by the British. The three ships were the first of a new type of specialized shore-bombardment warships. As a result of her shallow draught, she was very un-manoeuvrable and unseaworthy in open waters in anything more than a Force 5 wind.

== Service history ==
Severn had a relatively successful career during the First World War with at least three engagements. At the Battle of the Yser in 1914, off the coast of Belgium, she bombarded German troops as well as artillery positions. On 10 October 1914, she survived an attack by the submarine U-8 when a torpedo passed under the shallow draught vessel. In early 1915, the twin turret was removed and replaced by two shielded single 6 inch guns fore and aft. In July 1915, the monitor was towed to the Rufiji River delta in German East Africa where she and Mersey then assisted in the destruction of the German light cruiser Königsberg. She continued to serve on the East Africa station until 1918 and after a long refit in Alexandria, also served on the lower Danube until March 1919.

She was sold for breaking up on 9 May 1921 to Thos. W. Ward, of Preston, and arrived at their yards on 23 March 1923.
