= HMS Mersey (1914) =

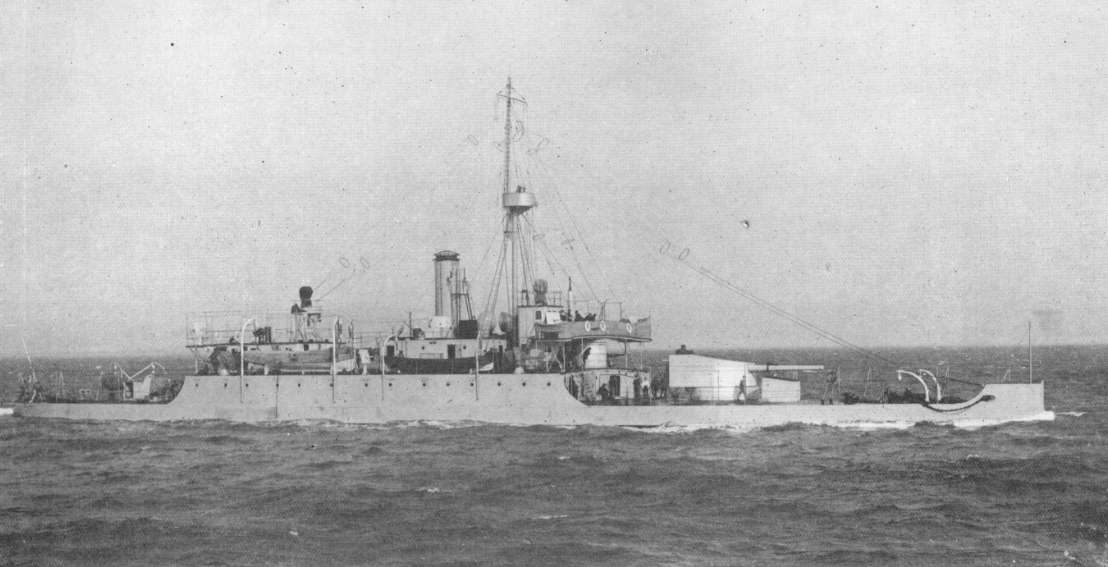
- HMS Mersey

History

Brazil
- Name: Madeira
- Builder: Vickers
- Laid down: 24 August 1912
- Launched: 30 September 1913
- Out of service: 3 August 1914
- Fate: Sold to the United Kingdom

United Kingdom
- Name: HMS Mersey
- Acquired: 3 August 1914
- Fate: Sold 1921 for scrapping

General characteristics
- Class & type: Humber-class monitor
- Displacement: 1,260 long tons (1,280 t)
- Length: 266 ft 9 in (81.3 m)
- Beam: 49 ft (14.9 m)
- Draught: 5 ft 7.2 in (1.7 m)
- Installed power: 1,450 ihp (1,080 kW)
- Propulsion: 2 × triple expansion engines; 2 × Yarrow boilers; 2 × screws
- Speed: 12 kn (22 km/h; 14 mph)
- Complement: 140
- Armament: 2 × 6 in (152 mm) guns; 2 × 4.7 in (119 mm) howitzers; 4 × 3-pounder guns; 1 × 3-pounder anti-aircraft gun
- Armour: Belt: 1.5–3 in (38–76 mm); Bulkheads: 1.5 in (38 mm); Barbette: 3.5 in (89 mm); Turret Face: 4 in (102 mm)

HMS Mersey was a Humber-class monitor of the Royal Navy. Originally built by Vickers for the Brazilian Navy and christened Madeira, she was purchased by the Royal Navy in 1914 on the outbreak of the First World War along with her sister ships Humber and Severn.

== Service history ==
Mersey had a relatively successful career in the First World War and had two prominent incidents. At the Battle of the Yser in 1914, off the coast of Belgium, she bombarded German troops as well as artillery positions. In July 1915, she was towed to the Rufiji River delta in German East Africa, where she and Severn then assisted in the destruction of the German light cruiser Königsberg. (Note: Her log books from March 1915 to December 1917 can be viewed online at naval-history.net)

On 6 July 1915 the two monitors undertook an extended engagement with the Königsberg, which had taken shelter in the shallow waters of the Rufiji Delta. The Mersey had its fore 6in. gun disabled in this initial action. Returning on 11 July the two monitors caused extensive damage to the German ship, forcing it to be scuttled.

The monitor later went to the Mediterranean and served on the River Danube.

Five crew died between January 3 and January 6, 1919. They are buried at the Commonwealth War Graves Commission Bucharest War Cemetery.

In 1921, she was sold to the breakers.

== Battle honours ==
- Battle of the Yser 1914–1915
- SMS Königsberg 1915
