= HMS Humber (1914) =

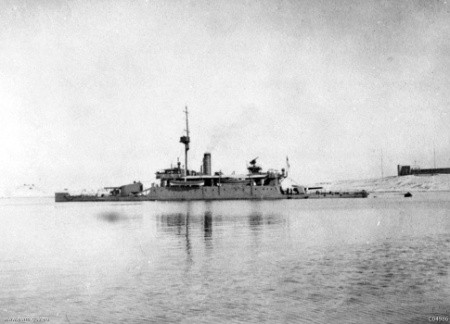
- HMS Humber at Matruh, Western Egypt. Note additional 6-inch gun aft.

History

Brazil
- Name: Javary
- Builder: Vickers
- Laid down: 24 August 1912
- Launched: 17 June 1913
- Out of service: 8 August 1914
- Fate: Sold to the United Kingdom

United Kingdom
- Name: HMS Humber
- Acquired: 8 August 1914
- Fate: Sold 17 September 1920 for use as a crane lighter

General characteristics
- Class & type: Humber-class monitor
- Displacement: 1,260 long tons (1,280 t)
- Length: 266 ft 9 in (81.31 m)
- Beam: 49 ft (15 m)
- Draught: 5 ft 7.2 in (1.7 m)
- Installed power: 1,450 ihp (1,080 kW)
- Propulsion: 2 × triple expansion steam engines; 2 × Yarrow boilers; 2 × screws
- Speed: 12 kn (22 km/h; 14 mph)
- Armament: 2 × 6 in (150 mm) guns; 2 ×4.7 in (120 mm) howitzers; 4 × 3-pounder guns; 1 × 3 in (76 mm) anti-aircraft gun
- Armour: Belt: 1.5–3 in (3.8–7.6 cm); Bulkheads: 1.5 in (3.8 cm); Barbette: 3.5 in (8.9 cm); Turret Face: 4 in (10 cm)

HMS Humber was a Humber-class monitor of the Royal Navy. Originally built by Vickers for Brazil as Javary, she was purchased by the Royal Navy in 1914 on the outbreak of the First World War along with her sister ships Severn and Mersey.

== Construction and design ==
In 1911 the Brazilian Navy was in an arms race with its South American counterparts. Towards the end of the year the British manufacturers Vickers, Son & Maxim, and Armstrong Whitworth were contacted to discuss the building of three shallow-draft river monitors that could be used by the Brazilian Navy in the inland waters of the Amazon River. Both companies submitted proposals for a class of monitors, and in January 1912 the Vickers design was chosen for construction. The design called for monitors of 1,200 tons, that would carry two 6 inches (150 mm) guns in a single twin turret on the forward part of the ship. Being meant for service on often shallow rivers, the design was purposefully given a large hull with a beam of 261 feet 6 inches (79.71 m) by 49 feet (15 m) to offset the shallow draught. To protect the vessels they were given 3 inches (76 mm) of side armour and 1 inch (25 mm) of deck armour, while the turret housing the guns was a modified Monmouth-class cruiser turret. Alongside this main armament, the monitors were given two 4.72 inches (120 mm) howitzers situated to the rear of the vessels, and four Vickers 3-pounders. Supplementing this were six machine guns.

With the class named after tributaries of the Amazon River, the lead monitor was named for the Javary River. Javary was completed by Vickers in October 1913 and sent to the River Clyde for sea trials. Planned to be able to reach a speed of 11.5 knots (21.3 km/h; 13.2 mph), Javary proved capable of reaching 12 knots (22 km/h; 14 mph) while going ahead, but it was also found that it was impossible to manoeuvre the ship while going astern. This was because the shallow draught of Javary had forced her two propellers to be built into tunnels in the hull, and when going astern the shafts did not receive enough water flow to operate. This was solved by a large hinged flap that could be hung over the stern of the ship to increase the water flow when going astern. As well as this Javary's rudders were made larger, necessitating an expansion of the length of the ship by 21 inches (530 mm).

Javary's gunnery trials took place simultaneously to her speed trials. It was found that the firing of the guns put large amounts of pressure on the joints holding the forward end of the superstructure, where the guns were situated, to the hull, and a plate was riveted along the joint of the side of the vessel to stop this. These modifications were completed by December. By February 1914 Javary and her sister ships Madeira and Solimoes were ready for delivery to Rio de Janeiro, but this was put on hold because the Brazilian Navy was not able to complete payment for the vessels because of the drop in the price of rubber, one of Brazil's main exports. With Brazil pulling out of their contract for the monitors, they were put up for sale by Vickers. The Romanian Navy investigated the three vessels, but river monitors were not a hot commodity and they remained unsold.

The ships sat laid up at the Vickers dock at Barrow. As the First World War approached, the First Lord of the Admiralty, Winston Churchill, was concerned that they might be purchased by a soon-to-be hostile power. Churchill ordered that the three monitors be taken up by the Royal Navy to avoid this, and on 3 August they were each bought from Vickers for £155,000.

== Service history ==
=== Dover Patrol ===
Javary was commissioned into the Royal Navy as HMS Humber on 8 August, three days after her crew had arrived on board and four days after the declaration of war. Her first commanding officer was Commander Arthur Lionel Snagge. The three monitors were converted for British service together, which was completed by 25 August. They sailed into the Walney Channel where Humber proved that she could no longer reach her previous speed, now running at only 9.67 knots (17.91 km/h; 11.13 mph). This was found to be because she behaved differently when fully loaded for wartime operations, and because she had been laid up alongside for so long that her hull had been fouled with growth. Humber and her sister ships would all struggle to reach speeds of double digits for the rest of their careers. They were initially sent to serve on the Dover Patrol, which was responsible for protecting the shipping routes around France and the English coast. Built for operations on sheltered rivers, the vessels did not handle well sailing through the Irish Sea on their way south, and the voyage took Humber three and a half days, reaching Dover on 29 August.

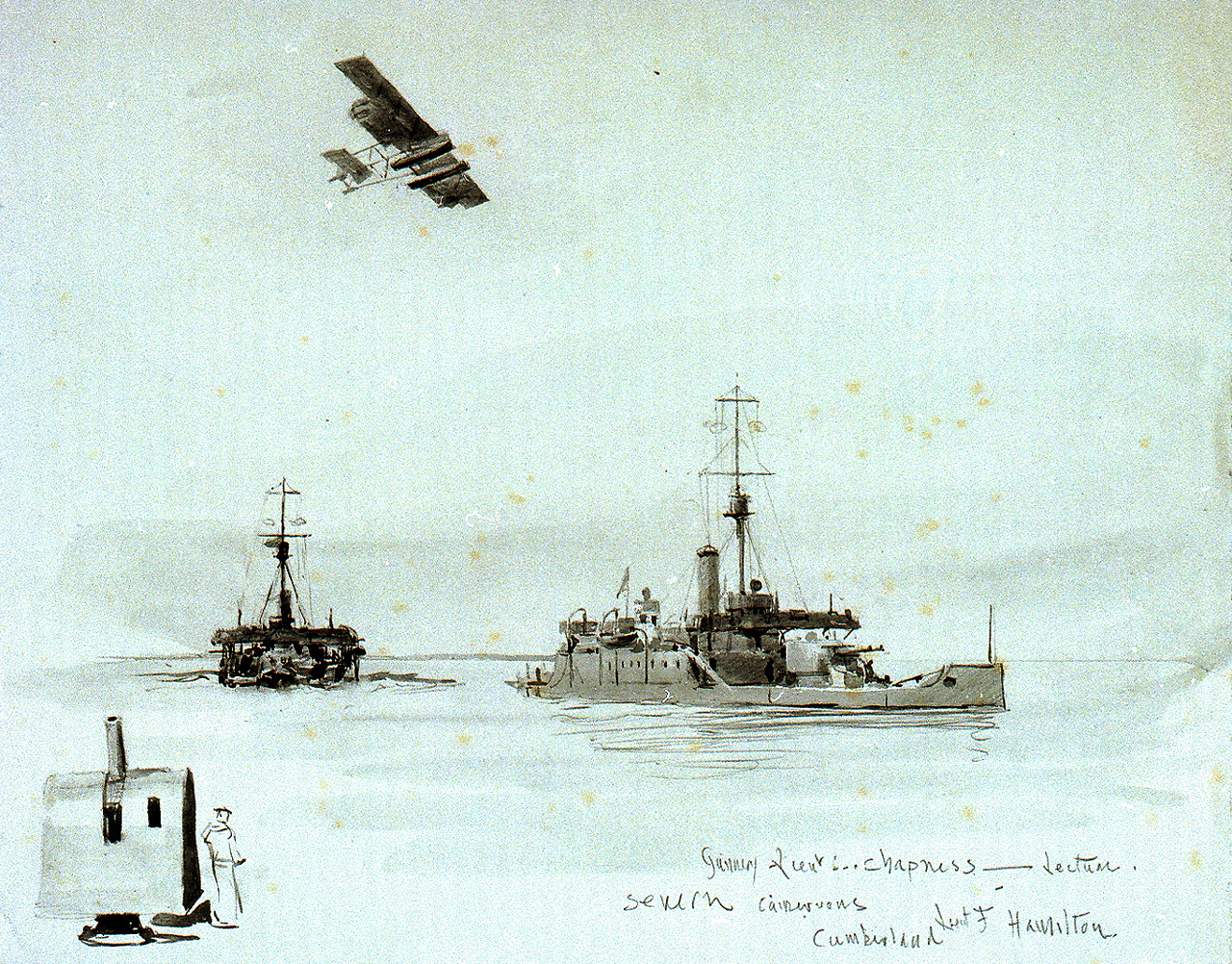
Severn and either Humber or Mersey in operations off the Belgian coast

Continuing to serve together, the three monitors saw their first wartime service on 31 August when they were ordered to sail to Ostend to help evacuate some Royal Marines from that port. By the time they arrived there the marines had already been removed, and the ships afterwards went to the Thames Estuary, which they patrolled for the next six weeks. While nearby, Humber had the deck armour over her magazine increased to 2 inches (51 mm) at Chatham Dockyard. As the Race to the Sea continued in Belgium, the three monitors were sent on 10 October to provide covering fire and protection off the coast, stationing themselves off Ostend. As the port was overrun by the German advance on the following day, the ships assisted in the final evacuation before sailing back to Dover.

After their return, the three monitors joined a new squadron that included the light cruiser HMS Attentive and was under the orders of Rear-Admiral Horace Hood. On 16 October the squadron sailed to the Belgian coast to provide support on their seaward flank. Bad weather hindered the passage of the cumbersome monitors, and they only reached Nieuport on 18 October. Anchoring 2,000 yards (1.1 mi) offshore on the following morning, Humber and her sister ships maintained a heavy bombardment on enemy forces advancing on Westende; the Germans fought back against the monitors with field guns, and several of Humber's crew were injured. To avoid this return fire the monitors increased their distance to 10,000 yards (5.7 mi) and continued to attack targets inland. On the afternoon of 20 October the attack on Westende was still ongoing, but the monitors were forced to withdraw to Dunkirk to replenish their supplies.

The ships returned to their station on 22 October and continued to fire until 1 November when the German advance was halted. Severn and Mersey returned to England on 3 November but Humber stayed off the coast, participating in another bombardment of (the now German held) Westende on 7 November. She then also returned to Chatham, where the monitors had their heavily worn guns looked at; Humber was the only ship to keep her original 6 inch guns, as they were less worn than those of her compatriots. As well as this, at this time Humber received a high angle QF 3-pounder Hotchkiss gun, which was placed towards the rear of the ship.

Later in November there was worry that the Germans would invade England through the Wash. Being a shallow area, the monitors were well-suited to operating there and they were stationed at Boston, Lincolnshire, to fend off any attack. The threat had receded by the middle of December and Humber detached from the other monitors to go to Chatham for further modifications. There she was fitted aft with a BL 6-inch Mk VII naval gun salvaged from the wreck of the battleship HMS Montagu; despite the age of the gun, it was far the least worn of Humber's now six inch weapons. Humber was reunited with Severn and Mersey when the latter two returned from the Belgian coast on 11 January. In March the three ships were ordered to go out to the Mediterranean Sea where they would be used on the River Danube after the expected forcing of the Dardanelles. Not being wholly seaworthy, the hulls of the monitors were strengthened and their extremities were boarded up to protect them. The ships were then taken under tow for the journey and their crews were taken on board the fleet messenger ship Trent. The ships left Devonport on 14 March and arrived at Malta on 29 March.

=== Gallipoli campaign ===
The three monitors were planned to go from Malta to Moudros where they would prepare to participate in the Gallipoli landings, but bad weather forced them to stay at Malta, where they were still on 19 April, six days before the planned landings. With their participation there now not possible, alternative plans were made. Severn and Mersey were diverted on 28 April to East Africa, where they were to bombard the light cruiser Königsberg which was holed up in the shallow Rufiji River. Humber stayed at Malta until May 1915 when news came of the torpedoing of the battleships HMS Triumph and HMS Majestic off the Dardanelles. With two major units of the fleet now lost, others had to be found to fill their places and Humber was brought in as part of this. She left Malta on 1 June and reached Gaba Tepe on 8 June, immediately starting bombardment operations. On 9 June she was firing on the village of Biyuk Anafarta when the right gun in her twin six inch mounting burst. The ex-Montagu gun was then put into action instead and Humber continued, firing only sparely to conserve ammunition, to serve off the Gallipoli beaches for the next few months, helping to cover the withdrawals from Suvla and ANZAC Cove in December as the campaign came to an end.

Humber afterwards sailed to Alexandria where her damaged forward guns were replaced. She was then ordered to Mersa Matruh to support British troops in the Senussi campaign. She arrived there on 30 January 1916 and served alongside the monitor HMS M31 until the end of March, when Humber was sent to Port Tewfik in the Suez Canal to protect against any Turkish attacks there. She saw very little action while stationed there, only very occasionally being required to fire at enemy aircraft as they flew over. On 4 August 1917 Humber was towed from Port Tewfik to Akaba by the armoured cruiser HMS Euryalus where she operated as a guardship. The monitor stayed there until February 1918 when she was towed to Alexandria by the cruiser HMS Grafton, being replaced as guardship at Akaba by M31.

At Alexandria Humber was reunited with Severn and Mersey who had returned from East Africa. The three were ordered to Moudros in October but before they could begin engaging Turkish and Bulgarian targets from there, armistices were signed that halted the fighting. They then sailed through the Dardanelles to Constantinople, from where Severn and Mersey travelled up the Danube but Humber was left there. The monitors returned to Britain in March 1919, from where they were ordered to join a squadron sent to serve in the White Sea as part of the Allied intervention in the Russian Civil War; the monitors were especially chosen for their ability to operate on the River Dvina. Humber arrived in England on 10 April from where she was planned to enter a refit before travelling to the White Sea, but a change in orders meant she was sent to carry out her mission immediately, and without her sister ships. She was towed from Devonport on 20 May.

=== Russian Civil War ===
Humber arrived on 14 June alongside the monitors HMS M27 and HMS M33, joining a large group of monitors already present. Soon after the monitors were heavily engaged in supporting a White Russian attack on two Russian villages, firing on enemy land batteries and assuring that the river was clear of enemy gunboats. Humber was found to be especially valuable in these operations because among the monitors she was one of the most heavily armed and protected, as well as being especially well suited for the river work because of her design for the Amazon. On 7 July the White Russians mutinied and killed their officers as well as the British soldiers fighting alongside them. Bolshevik attacks on the monitors subsequently increased as the British lost the support of their allies, and Humber was among the ships replying to these attacks, although only M33 was hit. The attacks dissipated by 9 July but the force was unable to leave the river because the water was low enough that they could not cross the sandbars. Instead they bombarded another Russian village as an Anglo-White Russian offensive was put in place to secure the area around the river.

With the river and monitors secured from Bolshevik attack, the British went to work on lightening the ships so that they had more of a chance of navigating the river. Humber removed her three-inch side armour as well as her aft six inch gun and two of her three-inch guns, which allowed her to get her draught down to around 5 feet 3 inches (1.6 m). She had successfully made the run to Arkhangelsk by 30 August, and in mid September she was the first monitor to return to Britain, being towed there alongside HMS M24.

== Fate ==
Humber was paid off at Chatham on 24 October and sold on 17 September 1920 to the shipbreaker Frank Rijsdijk for £5,510. Rijsdijk converted her into a crane barge for use in dismantling other warships in the River Medway. With her machinery removed and material from the broken up battleship SMS Oldenburg being used as a base for the crane, she continued working until 1925 when she was sold to Upnor Shipbreaking Company for use in the disposal of the wreck of the battleship HMS Bulwark which had blown up in 1914. By the early 1930s she was being employed by Haulbowline Industries to break up the ocean liner RMS Celtic after the latter ran aground, and then under the control of Dover Industries she returned to her work on Bulwark between 1935 and 1938. In 1939 Humber was sold to a French company, and she arrived off the coast of Brittany on 19 May to assist in breaking up the battleship France which had been wrecked off the coast in 1922. Humber's eventual fate is unknown, but it is suggested that she was broken up some time after 1945.
