= Humber-class monitor =

1914 class of British monitors

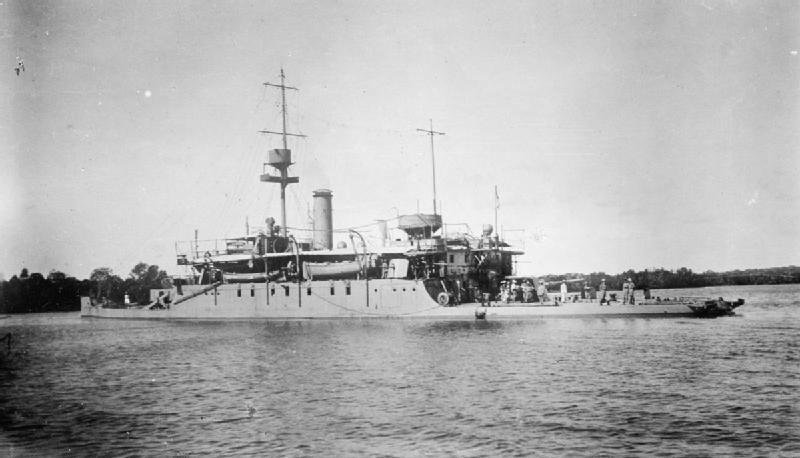
- HMS Severn off East Africa, 1917

Class overview
- Name: Humber class
- Builders: Vickers, Barrow in Furness
- Operators: Royal Navy; Brazilian Navy (intended)
- Succeeded by: Abercrombie class
- Cost: £155,000 (equivalent to £12.5MM in 2008)
- In service: 1914-1920
- Completed: 3
- Retired: 3

General characteristics
- Type: Monitor
- Displacement: 1,260 long tons (1,280 t) standard; 1,520 long tons (1,544 t) full load
- Length: 266.75 ft (81.3 m)
- Beam: 49 ft (14.9 m)
- Draught: 5.6 ft (1.7 m)
- Propulsion: 2 shaft triple expansion engines; 2 Yarrow boilers; 1,450 ihp (1,080 kW)
- Speed: 12 knots (22 km/h) designed, 9.5 knots (18 km/h) in practice
- Range: 1,650 nautical miles (3,060 km) at 8 knots (15 km/h)
- Armament: 2 × 6-inch (152 mm) guns in one twin turret; 2 × 4.7-inch (119 mm) howitzers; 4 × 3-pounder (47mm) guns; 1 × 3-pounder (47mm) AA gun; 6 × machine guns
- Armour: Belt: 3–1.5 in (76–38 mm); Bulkheads: 1.5 in (38 mm); Barbette: 3.5 in (89 mm); Turret face: 4 in (100 mm)
- Notes: Mersey and Severn had a turret replaced by two single 6-inch guns in open shielded mountings, Humber had an extra 6-inch gun fitted aft retaining turret

The Humber-class monitors were three large gunboats under construction for the Brazilian Navy in Britain in 1913. Designed for service on the Amazon River, the ships were of shallow draft and heavy armament and were ideally suited to inshore, riverine and coastal work but unsuitable for service at sea, where their weight and light draft reduced their speed from a projected twelve knots to under four. The class comprised Humber, Mersey and Severn. All three were taken over by the Royal Navy shortly before the outbreak of the First World War and were commissioned as small monitors. All three saw extensive service during the war and were sold in 1919.

== Construction ==
The three Humber-class monitors were originally ordered for the Brazilian Navy as the Javary-class gunboats intended for inshore work on the River Amazon and its tributaries. Ordered from the Vickers Limited shipyard at Barrow-in-Furness, the three ships were launched by 1913 and were undergoing sea trials when the Brazilian government informed Vickers that they would not be able to pay for the warships. Vickers attempted to find a foreign buyer for the boats and the British government stepped in to purchase the gunboats on 4 August 1914 for £155,000 each in order to prevent them being bought by a neutral navy and then sold on to Germany.

== War service ==
The ships were stationed at Dover for service in the English Channel, attached to the Dover Monitor Squadron. During the Battle of the Frontiers and subsequent operations in 1914, the Humber-class monitors were all employed in bombarding German batteries and positions, under the command of Rear-Admiral Horace Hood.

Severn and Mersey's guns soon wore out, and they were each re-armed with a single 6-inch Mk VII gun stripped from the wreck of Montagu, a battleship which had been wrecked on the Isle of Lundy in 1906. Humber retained her twin gun turret throughout the war, with guns being replaced by refurbished guns removed from the other two ships as needed.

During early 1915 Mersey and Severn were dispatched to German East Africa, where the German cruiser Königsberg was hidden in the Rufiji Delta. Only the long-range guns of the shallow-draft monitors could reach the hidden cruiser, and although the journey to East Africa took nearly six months under tow from Malta, the monitors were ultimately successful in destroying the German ship, their shells directed by two seaplane observers.

For the remainder of the war, all three ships participated in further attacks on German-held territory, Humber (which had been sent to the Dardanelles in 1915) in the Mediterranean and Mersey and Severn in German East Africa, where they operated against German positions in the colony. In 1918, Mersey and Severn were transferred to the Mediterranean as well.

== Humber-class monitors ==
- HMS Humber (ex-Javary); commissioned 1914, served in Dover Monitor Squadron, then in Mediterranean. Battle Honors: Belgian Coast 1914, Dardanelles 1915. Sold 17 September 1921 to F. Rijsdijk for use as a crane lighter.
- HMS Mersey (ex-Madeira); commissioned 1914, served in Dover Monitor Squadron and off the Rufiji Delta, ending war in the Mediterranean. Battle Honors: Belgian Coast 1914, Action v. SMS Königsberg 11 July 1915. Sold 9 May 1921 to Thos. W. Ward, broken up 1923.
- HMS Severn (ex-Solimoes); commissioned 1914, served in Dover Monitor Squadron and off the Rufiji Delta, ending war in Mediterranean. Battle Honors: Belgian Coast 1914, Action v. SMS Königsberg 11 July 1915. Sold 9 May 1921 to Thos. W. Ward, broken up 1923.
