= Powers of the prime minister of the United Kingdom =

Executive, Legislative, Parliamentary, and other powers

The prime minister of the United Kingdom exercises functions in both the executive and the legislature, as the UK has a fusion of powers.

Executive powers of the prime minister include obtaining at any time the appointment or dismissal of all other Government ministers, exercising the royal prerogative, setting the Government's policy agenda and priorities, and deploying the British Armed Forces overseas. In the legislature, the prime minister normally (but not necessarily) leads the largest party in the House of Commons, and therefore can normally gain Parliamentary support for their desired legislation. Most of the time the prime minister can control what is debated in the House of Commons, and when, as Government business has precedence (that is, priority) on every day it sits. General elections are called at a time of the prime minister's choosing, with a legal maximum of five years between elections. The prime minister, and other ministers appointed by the prime minister, make many of the most senior Crown appointments. The prime minister also has some power over their own party, in their role of party leader.

The powers of the prime minister come from several sources of the UK constitution, including both statute and constitutional convention, but not one single authoritative document. They have been described as "...problematic to outline definitively."

The status and executive powers of the British prime minister means that the incumbent is consistently ranked as one of the most powerful democratically elected leaders in the world.

== Definition of the role and its powers ==
Between 2011 and 2014, the Political and Constitutional Reform Select Committee conducted an inquiry into the "role and powers of the Prime Minister". In their report, they wrote:

When Lord Hennessy gave evidence to us, he commented: "the role of the Prime Minister is like the British constitution as a whole—you think you are getting close and it disappears into the mists." With the role itself difficult to define, it is not surprising that the powers of the person who fulfils the role are similarly problematic to outline definitively. Most powers exercised by the Prime Minister are not defined in statute and cannot be found in one place. In his book The Prime Minister: The office and its holders since 1945, Lord Hennessy stated: "Arguments have raged around the powers of the British Prime Minister for nearly 300 years."

Without a clear definition of the role of prime minister, the powers associated with the office have been able to evolve and accumulate, unhindered by statute, over hundreds of years...

There is no single authoritative source for what the role involves and the powers the prime minister can exercise.

Documents describing the role and powers of the PM include:

- From 1947 to 1948, the Cabinet Office prepared a paper titled "Function of the Prime Minister and his Staff".
- In 2002, a private member's bill was drafted to define the "office, role and functions" of the PM, but this was never passed.
- In 2011, the Cabinet Office published The Cabinet Manual, setting out the main laws, rules and conventions affecting the conduct and operation of government, including a description of the role of the PM.
- In 2011, Peter Hennessy gave a list of 47 functions, under eight headings, of the prime minister.
- In 2014, the Political and Constitutional Reform Select Committee produced a final report to their Inquiry, titled Role and powers of the Prime Minister.

== Executive powers ==
=== Appointing ministers ===
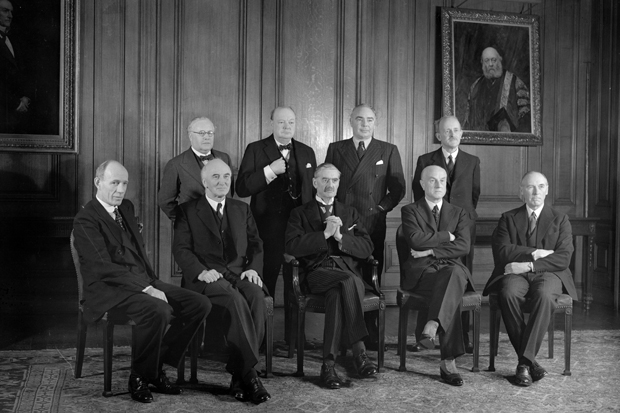
Prime Minister Neville Chamberlain (front, centre), and his September 1939 War Cabinet

When commissioned by the sovereign, a new prime minister's first requisite is to "form a Government"—to create a cabinet of ministers that has the support of the House of Commons, of which he is expected to be a member. The prime minister nominates all other cabinet members to the sovereign for appointment (who then, if they are not already, names them Privy Counsellors) and ministers, and although consulting senior ministers on their junior ministers, without any Parliamentary or other control or process over these powers. The prime minister decides the ranking order of all ministers.

The prime minister holds powers of patronage which means that at any time, he may obtain the appointment, dismissal or nominal resignation of any other minister. The prime minister may implement a cabinet reshuffle; one famous example was the Night of the Long Knives in 1962. The prime minister may resign, either purely personally or with the whole government. A prime minister is no longer just "first among equals" in HM Government; although theoretically the Cabinet might still outvote the prime minister, in practice the prime minister progressively entrenches his position by retaining only personal supporters in the Cabinet. In occasional reshuffles, the prime minister can sideline and simply drop from Cabinet the Members who have fallen out of favour; they remain Privy Counsellors, but the prime minister decides which of them are summoned to meetings.

The Ministerial and other Maternity Allowances Act 2021 provides for the prime minister to grant certain office holders six months' maternity leave at full pay. In the case of ministers, the prime minister may designate that person a 'Minister on Leave', which comes with the salary of that person's previous office for up to six months.

The prime minister is responsible for producing and enforcing the Ministerial Code.

=== Royal prerogative powers ===
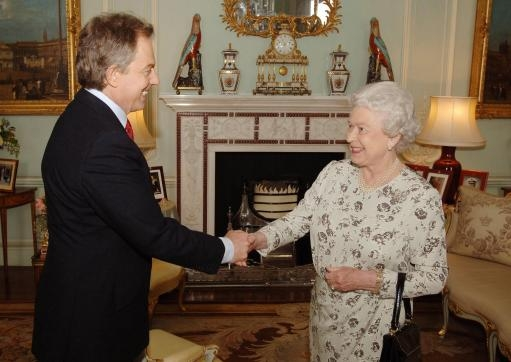
Queen Elizabeth II receiving Prime Minister Tony Blair after winning a third term in office on 6 May 2005

The prime minister formally kisses the hands of the sovereign, whose royal prerogative powers are thereafter exercised solely on the advice of the prime minister and His Majesty's Government ("HMG"). The prime minister has weekly audiences with the sovereign, whose rights are constitutionally limited by convention: "to warn, to encourage, and to be consulted"; the extent of the sovereign's ability to influence the nature of the prime ministerial advice is unknown, but presumably varies depending upon the personal relationship between the sovereign and the prime minister of the day.

As, by constitutional convention, the monarch acts on ministerial advice in all but exceptional cases, it is effectively ministers who exercise the royal prerogative. And it is, in reality, the prime minister who appoints, accepts the resignations of and dismisses ministers. Rodney Brazier has said:

Of greatest political importance is the Prime Minister's personal authority, which stems from his ability to use, or to advise the Sovereign to use, certain prerogatives. If this country has prime ministerial government, it is based on the Prime Minister's personal authority which, although political in effect, is rooted in the prerogative.

=== Government policy ===
The prime minister sets the Government's policy agenda and priorities, and generally co-ordinates the policies and activities of the Cabinet and Government departments, acting as the main public "face" of His Majesty's Government. The prime minister is ultimately responsible for all policy and decisions.

The prime minister can overrule the policy decisions of individual ministers. Boris Johnson reportedly overruled home secretary Priti Patel on closing UK borders, Tony Blair overruled Scottish secretary Donald Dewar on devolving abortion powers to Scotland, Gordon Brown overruled chancellor Alistair Darling on VAT rates, and Margaret Thatcher overruled home secretary Leon Brittan on parole for Ian Brady and Myra Hindley.

Some policy decisions are made by the Cabinet. The prime minister chairs the Cabinet, decides its membership, and when and where meetings take place. Other important policy decisions are made by the Cabinet Committees. The prime minister is free to decide the Cabinet Committees' structure, membership, chairmanship, and terms of reference. A number of Cabinet Committees are chaired by the PM.

The prime minister is the minister responsible for national security, and matters affecting MI5, MI6 and GCHQ collectively, though other ministers may authorise individual operations. The PM chairs the National Security Council, and appoints the National Security Adviser.

Prime Minister Cameron's speech at Bloomberg in 2013, in which he announced he would hold a Brexit referendum

Some Government policy decisions are of such significance that the ultimate decision of how to proceed is made by the prime minister rather than the relevant minister. For example:

- In 1842, prime minister Robert Peel re-introduced income tax.
- In 2006–2007, prime minister Tony Blair decided that the UK should renew Trident.
- In October 2007, prime minister Gordon Brown approved the construction of Crossrail.
- In 2016, David Cameron called an EU referendum.
- In September 2016, Theresa May authorised the building of Hinkley Point C nuclear power station.
- In 2020–2021, Boris Johnson decided that various restrictions and lockdowns should be imposed in response to the COVID-19 pandemic.

The prime minister might have his own policy agenda which he drives to implement. For example:

- Margaret Thatcher drove forward a set of policies now known as Thatcherism.
- Tony Blair led his Government in following a strategy known as the Third Way.
- David Cameron pushed forward implementation of the Big Society concept.
- Theresa May sought to expand the number of grammar school places.

=== Machinery of government ===
The prime minister has "almost complete discretion over how to organise government departments". The PM is free to, at any time, create government departments, merge them, rename them, transfer responsibilities between them, and abolish them.

=== The civil service ===
The prime minister of the day has held the office of Minister for the Civil Service since that office was created in 1968. As such the PM has the powers over His Majesty's Civil Service held by that position. These powers may be delegated by the prime minister to others. This power is under review.

=== Ministers' advisers ===
The Constitutional Reform and Governance Act 2010 states that a special adviser to a minister in the UK government can only be appointed if the appointment has been approved by the prime minister.

Similarly, the Ministerial Code says that while Cabinet Ministers and Ministers of State may appoint Parliamentary Private Secretaries, all appointments require the prior written approval of the prime minister.

=== The Armed Forces ===
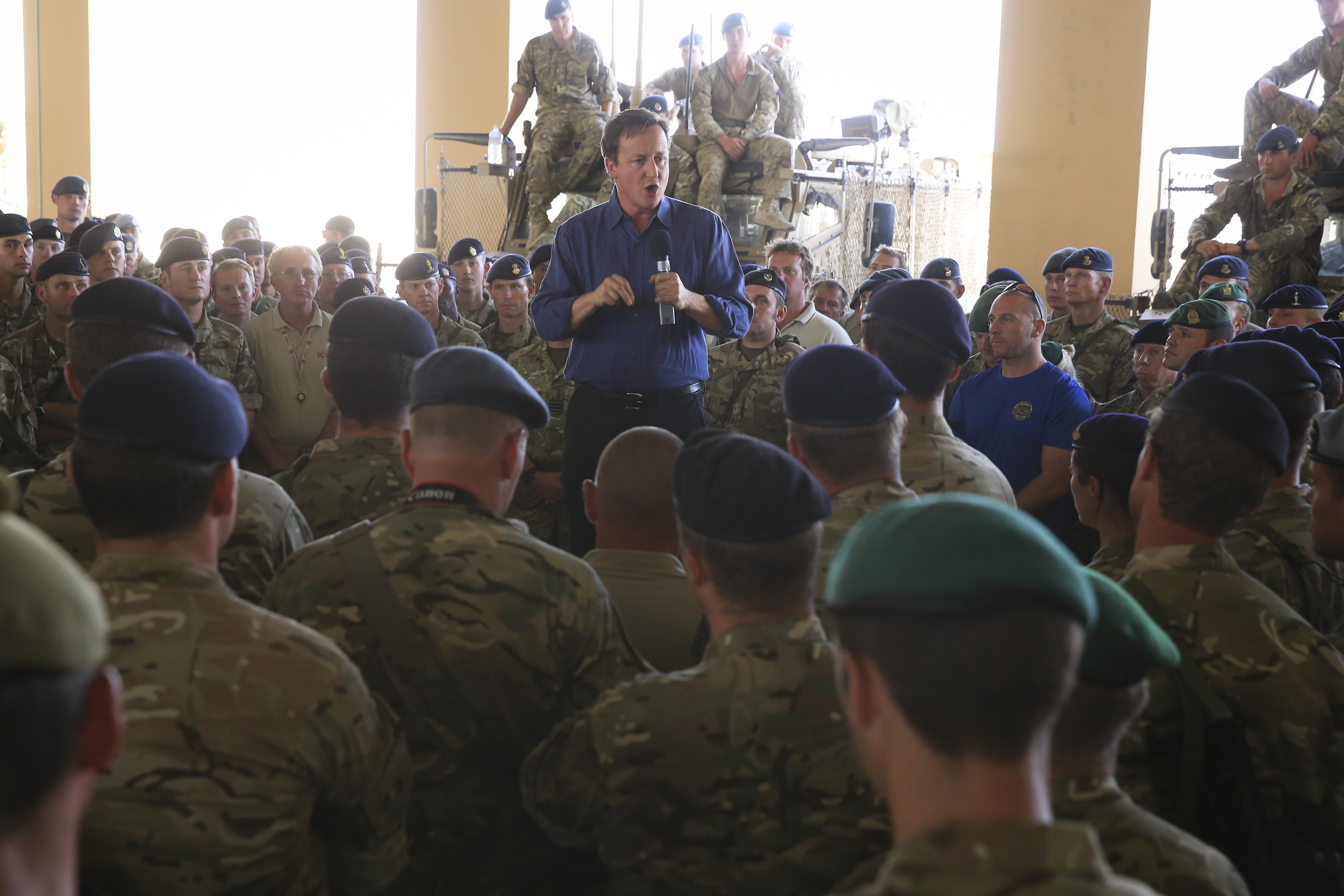
Prime Minister David Cameron visits British troops in Afghanistan.

The Head of the Armed Forces is the monarch. However, Hennessy says that "war is an intensely prime ministerial activity."

The decision to deploy the armed forces overseas rests with the prime minister or the Cabinet, through the exercise of the royal prerogative. Constitutional convention requires that, in the event of a commitment of the armed forces to military action, authorisation is given by the prime minister, on behalf of the Crown. Decisions on military action are taken within the Cabinet with advice. The Defence Council has power of command over members of the armed forces.

However, in 2011, the government of the United Kingdom acknowledged that a constitutional convention had developed whereby the House of Commons should have an opportunity to debate the matter before troops are committed. It said that it proposed to observe that convention except when there was an emergency and such action would not be appropriate.

Similarly, declarations of war by Great Britain and the United Kingdom are through the exercise of the royal prerogative by ministers, and led by the prime minister.

The prime minister is responsible for the decision to shoot down a hijacked aircraft or an unidentified civil aircraft which responds neither to radio contact nor the signals of RAF interceptor jets, before it reaches a conurbation or a key target on UK territory. The prime minister is also responsible for authorising the use of UK nuclear weapons, including the preparation of four letters of last resort. He also appoint deputies for both of these purposes.

== Legislative powers ==
=== Primary legislation ===
The prime minister normally has significant power to change the law through passing primary legislation, as the PM is, by definition, able to command a majority in the House of Commons. Therefore, the PM can normally gain House of Commons support for his desired legislation (and House of Commons rejection of any undesirable legislation) - Government defeats in the House of Commons are unusual.

Primary legislation must also be passed by the House of Lords, and while Government defeats in the Lords are more frequent, the power of the Lords to reject a bill passed by the Commons is restricted by conventions and the Parliament Acts. In extremis, as members of the Lords are appointed by the sovereign on the advice of the PM, the PM could appoint, or threaten to appoint, enough peers to the House of Lords who will support the legislation to force the Lords to pass it.

The prime minister appoints officials known as the "Government Whips", who negotiate for the support of MPs and to discipline dissenters. Party discipline is strong since electors generally vote for individuals on the basis of their party affiliation. Members of Parliament may be expelled from their party for failing to support the Government on important issues, and although this will not mean they must resign as MPs, it will usually make re-election difficult. Members of Parliament who hold ministerial office or political privileges can expect removal for failing to support the prime minister. Restraints imposed by the Commons grow weaker when the Government's party enjoys a large majority in that House, or among the electorate. In most circumstances, however, the prime minister can secure the Commons' support for almost any bill by internal party negotiations, with little regard to the Opposition MPs.

The domination of Parliament by the government of the day has been called an "Elective dictatorship".

However, even a government with a healthy majority can on occasion find itself unable to pass legislation. For example, on 9 November 2005, Tony Blair's Government was defeated over plans which would have allowed police to detain terror suspects for up to 90 days without charge, and on 31 January 2006, was defeated over certain aspects of proposals to outlaw religious hatred. On other occasions, the Government alters its proposals to avoid defeat in the Commons, as Blair's Government did in February 2006 over education reforms.

=== Secondary legislation ===
Ministers, including the prime minister and other ministers over whom the prime minister has the power of appointment and dismissal, are given the power to create and change certain laws (secondary legislation) by parent Acts of Parliament (primary legislation).

== Parliamentary powers ==
=== When Parliament meets ===
After a general election, the date of the first meeting of a new Parliament "is determined by a proclamation issued by the Sovereign, on the advice of the Prime Minister."

Under House of Commons Standing Order 13, the prime minister can ask the speaker to recall Parliament while it is on recess, who then decides. For example, in August 2013, David Cameron asked the Speaker to recall Parliament to discuss the Syrian civil war, and the use of chemical weapons by the Syrian government.

The power to close Parliament between sessions (prorogation) is a royal prerogative, that is, it belongs to the monarch. However, in practice the monarch exercises this power at the request of the prime minister. (Formally it is exercised on the advice of the Privy Council.) Though the prorogation of Parliament by PM Johnson in 2019 was overturned by the Supreme Court, which ruled that his advice to the Queen to prorogue Parliament "was outside the powers of the Prime Minister".

Until the passing of the Fixed-term Parliaments Act 2011 (FTPA), the power to dissolve Parliament and call a General Election also belonged to the monarch, in practice exercised when the PM asked the monarch to do so (with a legal maximum of five years between Elections since the Parliament Act 1911, before that a maximum of seven years since the Septennial Act 1716). The FTPA removed this power from both the monarch and the PM, giving the circumstances in which a General Election can be held, and stated "Parliament cannot otherwise be dissolved". (Though this could be overridden by passing a separate Act, such as the Early Parliamentary General Election Act 2019.) The Dissolution and Calling of Parliament Act 2022 repealed the FTPA and restored the prime minister's power to call a general election at a time of his choosing.

Formerly, a prime minister whose government lost a Commons vote would be regarded as fatally weakened, and the whole government would resign, usually precipitating a general election. In modern practice, when the Government party has an absolute majority in the House, only loss of supply and the express vote "that this House has no confidence in Her Majesty's Government" are treated as having this effect; dissenters on a minor issue within the majority party are unlikely to force an election with the probable loss of their seats and salaries.

=== Parliamentary business ===
House of Commons Standing Order 14 states that government business has precedence (that is, priority) on every day it sits. Therefore, most of the time the PM can control what is debated in the House of Commons, and when. Even with non-Government business, although the PM does not control the topics raised, the Government controls "when the time allotted to the Opposition or backbench business is scheduled—meaning that they can simply choose to delay scheduling this time if they think something politically embarrassing might be debated." This means it is difficult for Parliament to debate matters, and extremely difficult for Parliament to pass legislation, against the Government's (and PM's) will.

King's Consent is required before certain types of bill can be debated by Parliament. The prime minister can advise the Monarch to withhold his consent, thus preventing Parliament debating the bill. For example, prime minister Harold Wilson used this power in 1964 and 1969 to prevent Parliament debating bills about peerages and Zimbabwean independence.

=== Other parliamentary powers ===
The Intelligence Services Act 1994, which established the Intelligence and Security Committee of Parliament (ISC), gave the PM the power to appoint the members of the ISC. The Justice and Security Act 2013 reduced this instead to a power to nominate the nine members of the ISC, and these nominees are then voted upon and appointed by Parliament. This is different to the Select Committees, whose members are elected. Under the 1994 act, the PM had the power to appoint the chair, but since the 2013 act, the chair is now chosen by the ISC members. In 2020, PM Boris Johnson's preference for chair was Chris Grayling, but the ISC members elected Julian Lewis. The PM has the power to agree a MOU with the ISC that sets out what other government activities the ISC may oversee that are not covered in the act. The PM is able to control what operational matters are considered by the ISC. The PM has the right to see any ISC report before it is laid before Parliament, and can require the ISC to exclude any matter from any of its reports if the PM considers that the matter would be prejudicial to the continued discharge of the functions of the intelligence services.

From 1966, the Wilson Doctrine meant the telephones of parliamentarians could not be tapped unless the prime minister chose to reverse this policy. Subsequent prime ministers have regularly confirmed that the ban remains in place. The Investigatory Powers Act 2016 codifies the prime minister's power over the interception of parliamentarians' communications, as it requires that a warrant authorising the interception of communications of Parliamentarians (or members of devolved legislatures) may only be issued with the approval of the prime minister.

== Powers of appointment ==
The prime minister makes all the most senior Crown appointments, and most others are made by ministers over whom the prime minister has the power of appointment and dismissal. Privy Counsellors, Ambassadors and High Commissioners, senior civil servants, senior military officers, members of important committees and commissions, and other officials are selected, and in most cases may be removed, by the prime minister. The prime minister also formally advises the sovereign on the appointment of archbishops and bishops of the Church of England, but the prime minister's discretion is limited by the existence of the Crown Nominations Commission. The appointment of senior judges, while constitutionally still on the advice of the prime minister, is now made on the basis of recommendations from independent bodies.

Peerages, knighthoods, and most other honours are bestowed by the sovereign only on the advice of the prime minister. The only important British honours over which the prime minister does not have control are the Order of the Garter, the Order of the Thistle, the Order of Merit, the Royal Victorian Chain, the Royal Victorian Order, and the Order of St John, which are all within the "personal gift" of the sovereign.

The Investigatory Powers Act 2016 (IPA) gives the PM the power to appoint the Investigatory Powers Commissioner and other Judicial Commissioners, who oversee use of the IPA. The PM can require the Commissioner to make a report to him at any time, and the PM can exclude from publication any part of the Commissioner's reports if the PM decides it meets certain criteria.

The PM appoints the chair of each of the public sector pay Review Bodies, and decides whether to implement their recommendations. For the Police Remuneration Review Body, this power of appointment is provided by the Anti-social Behaviour, Crime and Policing Act 2014.

=== Museums and galleries ===
- The Imperial War Museum Act 1920 makes the prime minister the appointing authority for 10 members of the Museum's Board of Trustees.
- The British Museum Act 1963 provides for the prime minister to appoint 15 of the 25 Trustees of the British Museum, and for the Director of the British Museum to be appointed only with the approval of the prime minister.
- Under the Museums and Galleries Act 1992, the prime minister appoints the members of the Boards of Trustees of the National Gallery (except one member), the Tate Gallery (except one member), the National Portrait Gallery, and the Wallace Collection.
- The National Heritage Act 1983 provides for the prime minister to appoint the members and the chairs of the Boards of Trustees of the Victoria and Albert Museum and the Science Museum, and for the Director of the Victoria and Albert Museum and Director of the Science Museum to be appointed only with the approval of the prime minister.

== Powers over the political party ==
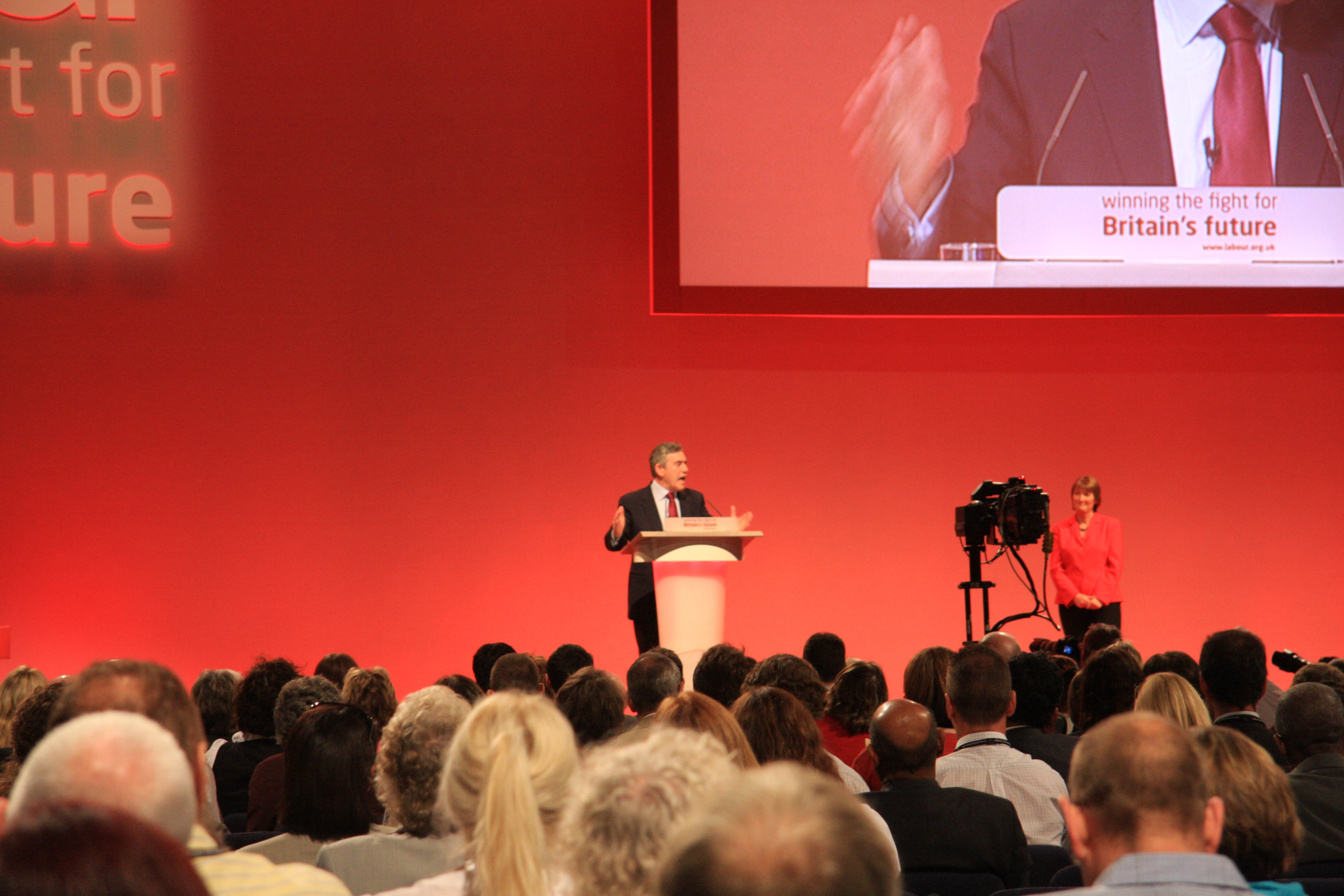
Prime Minister Gordon Brown addresses the 2008 Labour Party conference.

The prime minister is leader of his political party. In recent decades the prime minister has been either the Leader of the Conservative Party (UK) or Leader of the Labour Party (UK). As such the PM has the powers over his party given to the leader by his party's rules at the time.

- Suspending or expelling MPs from the party. For example, in May 2009, Gordon Brown suspended Elliot Morley from the Parliamentary Labour Party. In the September 2019 suspension of rebel Conservative MPs, Boris Johnson withdrew the whip from (expelled from the Conservative party) 21 MPs, then later re-admitted some.
- Appointing some party officials. The Chairman of the Conservative Party and Treasurer of the Conservative Party are appointed by the leader of the Conservative party, therefore by the prime minister when the Conservative leader is prime minister. The Chair of the Labour Party (UK) (different to the chair of Labour's National Executive Committee) is appointed by the leader of the Labour party. For example, in the May 2006 reshuffle, Tony Blair replaced Labour Chair Ian McCartney with Hazel Blears.
- The party's governing body. The leaders can appoint/nominate some member(s) of the Conservative Party Board and National Executive Committee of the Labour Party. For example, Tony Blair refused to grant Chancellor Gordon Brown a seat on the NEC in 2003, but did so in 2005.

== International powers ==
The UK has considerable international soft power. For example, following the poisoning of Sergei and Yulia Skripal in 2018, a number of countries and other organisations expelled a total of more than 150 Russian diplomats in a show of solidarity with the UK, a result largely attributed to prime minister Theresa May.

The prime minister attends the annual G7 forum, widely considered to wield significant international influence.

The prime minister was required to extend Brexit deadlines by the European Union (Withdrawal) Act 2019 and European Union (Withdrawal) (No. 2) Act 2019 (now both repealed).

== Other powers (residences) ==
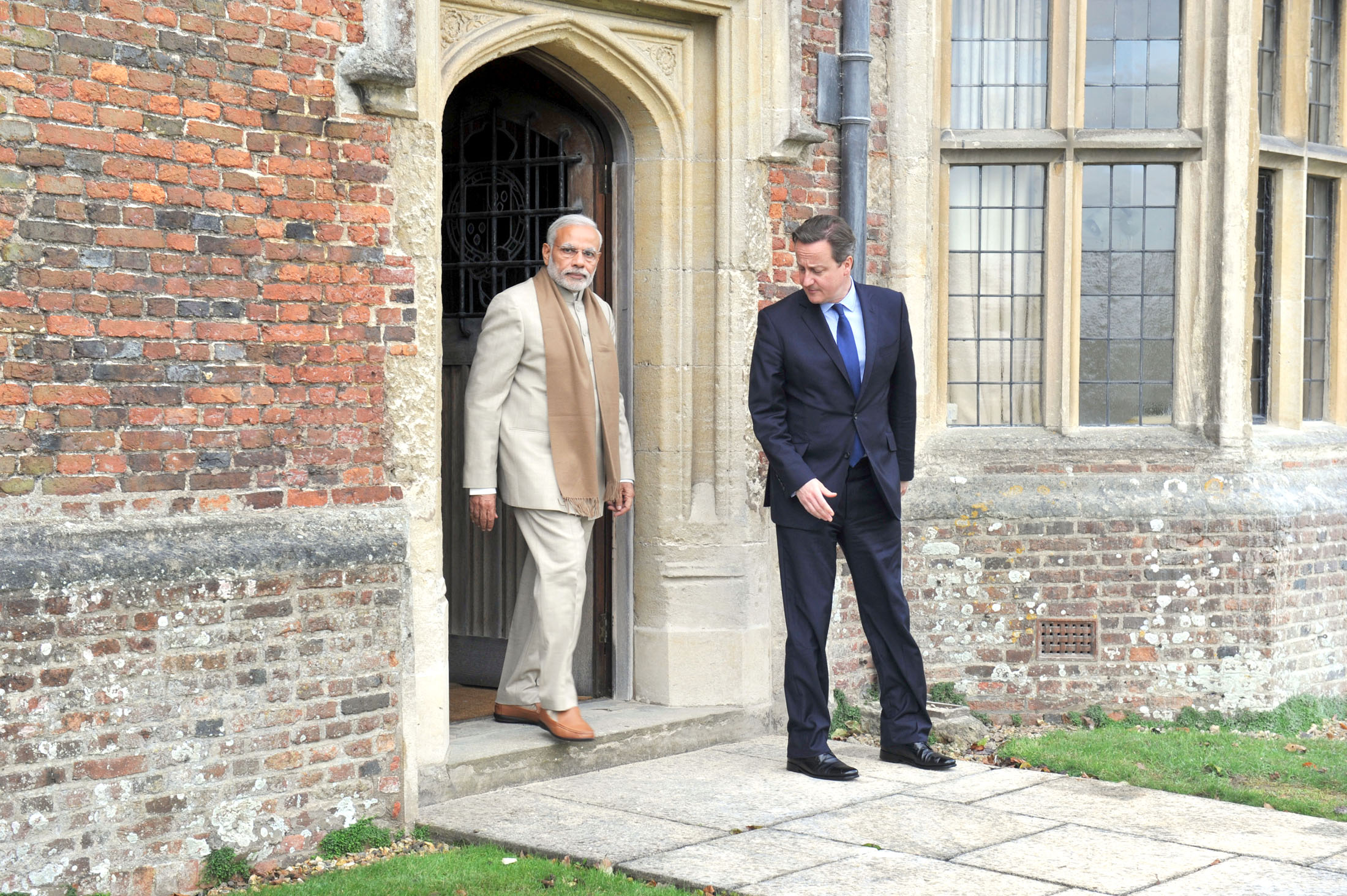
Prime Ministers Narendra Modi and David Cameron at Chequers

In 1732, King George II offered to give 10 Downing Street to Robert Walpole, but he accepted on the condition that the gift was to the office of First Lord of the Treasury rather than to him personally. Therefore, the prime minister has the right to reside there, when he also holds that position (as has historically usually, though not always, been the case). While 11 Downing Street is the official residence of the Chancellor, in practice the prime minister and chancellor may switch, with the prime minister occupying Number 11, though Number 10 remains his official residence.

The Chequers Estate Act 1917 gives the prime minister the right to use Chequers as his official country residence.

The terms of the charitable trust, established in 1942, which owns Dorneywood, give the prime minister the right to use Dorneywood himself or nominate, at his discretion, another Minister to be its resident.

Under the Chevening Estate Act 1959, the prime minister can occupy Chevening, or can nominate a Cabinet minister or a lineal descendant of King George VI, or the spouse, widow or widower of such a descendant, to occupy it.

== Contemporary theories of prime ministerial power ==
Varying and competing theories of the role and power of the contemporary modern prime minister have emerged in the post-war period, particularly in response to new styles of leadership and governance. The classic view of Cabinet Government was laid out by Walter Bagehot in The English Constitution (1867) in which he described the prime minister as the primus inter pares ("first among equals"). This view was challenged in The British Cabinet by John P. Mackintosh, who instead used the terminology of Prime Ministerial Government to describe the British government. This transformation, according to Mackintosh primarily resulted because of the diminishing role of the Cabinet Ministers and because of centralisation of the party machine and the bureaucracy. Richard Crossman also alluded to the presidentialisation of British politics in the Introduction to the 1963 version of Walter Bagehot's The English Constitution. Crossman mentions the Second World War, and its immediate aftermath as a water-shed moment for Britain that led to immense accumulation of power in the hands of the British prime minister These powers, according to Crossman, are so immense that their study require the use of presidential parallels.

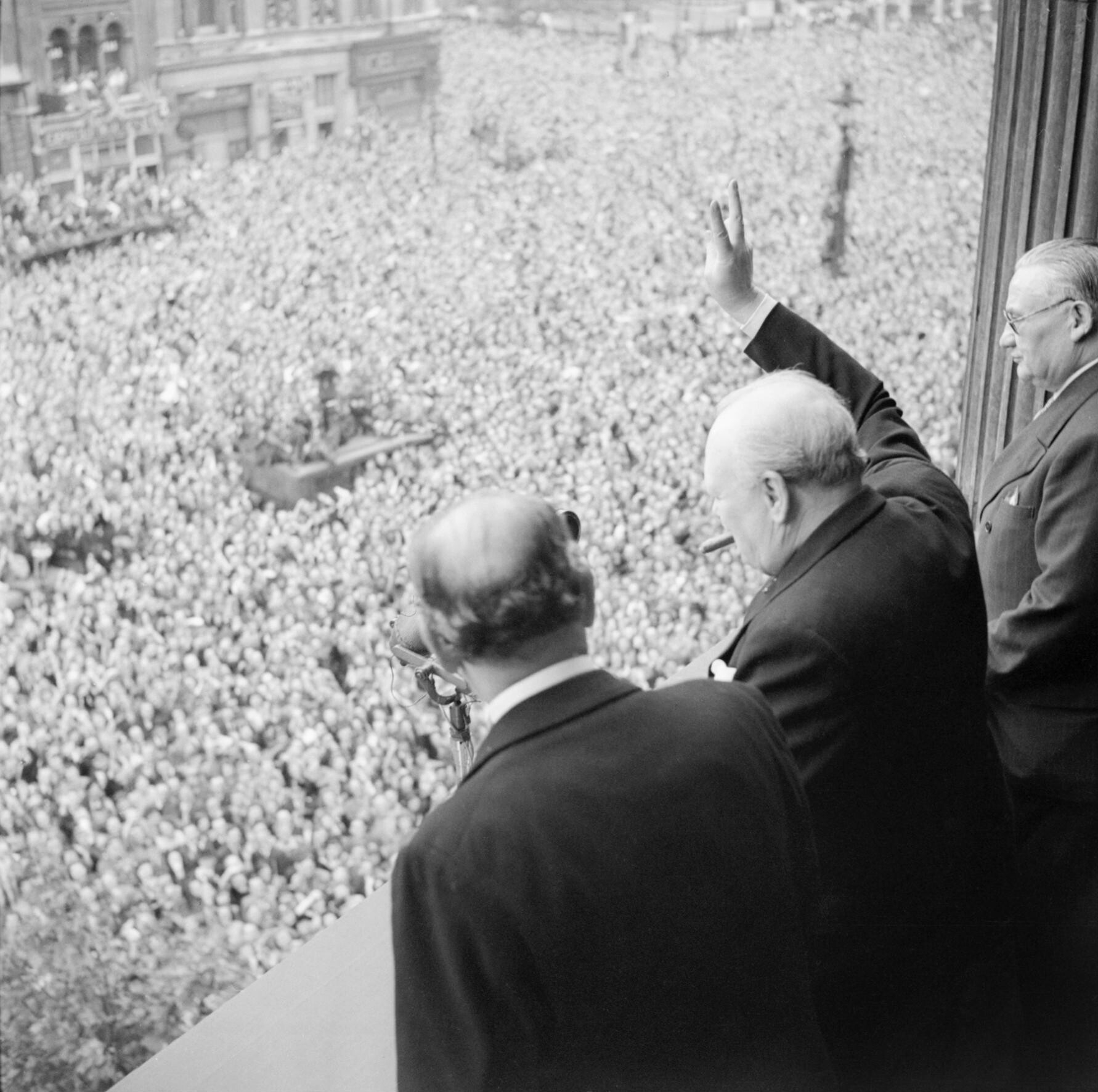
Churchill waving to crowds after announcing the surrender of Nazi Germany in May 1945

=== Presidentialisation thesis ===
The most prominent characterisation of prime ministerial power to emerge is the presidentialisation thesis. This asserts that the prime minister has become more detached from Cabinet, party and Parliament and operates as if the occupant of the office is elected directly by the people. The thesis is usually presented with comparisons to the American Presidency. Thomas Poguntke and Paul Webb define it as:

"the development of increasing leadership power resources and autonomy within the party and the political executive respectively, and increasingly leadership-centered electoral processes."

The thesis has been most popularised by Michael Foley, who wrote two books, namely, The Rise of the British Presidency, and The British Presidency: Tony Blair and the Politics of Public Leadership that are solely dedicated to the subject of presidentialisation in Britain. Foley writes:

The British Prime Minister has to all intents and purposes turned, not into a British version of an American president, but into an authentically British president.

The thesis has been widely applied to the premiership of Tony Blair as many sources such as former ministers have suggested that decision-making was controlled by him and Gordon Brown, and the Cabinet was no longer used for decision-making. Former ministers such as Clare Short and Chris Smith have criticised the lack of decision-making power in Cabinet. When she resigned, Short denounced "the centralisation of power into the hands of the prime minister and an increasingly small number of advisers". Graham Allen (a Government Whip during Tony Blair's first government) made the case in The Last Prime Minister: Being Honest About the UK Presidency (2003) that in fact the office of Prime Minister has presidential powers.

The notion of presidentialisation in British politics has been criticised, however, due to the structural and constitutional differences between Britain and the United States. These authors cite the stark differences between the British parliamentary model, with its principle of parliamentary sovereignty, and the American presidential model, which has its roots in the principle of separation of powers. For example, according to John Hart, using the American example to explain the accumulation of power in the hands of the British PM is flawed and that changing dynamics of the British executive can only be studied in Britain's own historical and structural sense. The power that a prime minister has over his Cabinet colleagues is directly proportional to the amount of support that he has from his political party and this is often related to whether the party considers him to be an electoral asset or liability. Additionally, when a party is divided into factions a prime minister may be forced to include other powerful party members in the Cabinet for party political cohesion. The prime minister's personal power is also curtailed if his party is in a power-sharing arrangement, or a formal coalition with another party (as happened in the coalition government of 2010 to 2015).

Keith Dowding argues, as well, that British prime ministers are already more powerful than the American presidents, as the prime minister is part of the legislature. Therefore, unlike presidents, the prime minister can directly initiate legislation and due to the context British politics functions within, faces fewer "veto players" than a president. Thus, Dowding argues that adding to these powers, makes the prime minister less like presidents, and that what Britain is witnessing can be best explained as Prime Ministerialisation of British politics. The work of Martin J. Smith, importantly, runs contrary to these increasingly personalised conceptualisations of the modern prime minister, however. The Core Executive model asserts that prime ministerial power (especially of individual leaders, such as Thatcher and Blair) has been greatly overstated, and, instead, is both dependent upon and constrained by relationships, or "dependency linkages", with other institutions in government, such as members of the Cabinet or the Treasury. In this model, prime ministers are seen to have improved their institutional position, but rejects the notion that they dominate government and that they act, or have the ability to act, as Presidents due to the aforementioned dependencies and constraints "that define decision-making in central government." Smith emphasises "complex resource relationships" (or rather how formal and informal powers are used) and what resources a particular actor possesses. In this case, the prime minister naturally holds more resources than others. These include patronage, control of the Cabinet agenda, appointment of Cabinet Committees and the prime minister's office, as well as collective oversight and the ability to intervene in any policy area. However, all actors possess "resources" and government decision making relies upon resource exchange in order to achieve policy goals, not through command alone. Smith originally used this model to explain the resignation of Margaret Thatcher in 1990, concluding that:

Government is not cabinet government or prime ministerial government. Cabinets and Prime Ministers act within the context of mutual dependence based on the exchange of resources with each other and with other actors and institutions within the core executive.

=== Prime ministerial leadership as statecraft ===
Prime ministerial leadership has been described by academics as needing to involve successful statecraft. Statecraft is the idea that successful prime ministers need to maintain power in office in order to achieve any substantive long-term policy reform or political objectives. To achieve successful statecraft leaders must undertake key tasks including demonstrating competence in office, developing winning electoral strategies and carefully managing the constitution in order to protect their political interests. Interviews with former prime ministers and party leaders in the UK found the approach to be an accurate part of some of the core tasks of political leadership. Tony Blair was the first prime minister to be assessed using the academic framework and was judged to be a successful leader in these terms. Assessments have been made of other leaders using the model.

== See also ==
- Powers of the home secretary
- Powers of the police in the United Kingdom
- Powers of the fire service in the United Kingdom
- Powers of the president of the United States

== Works cited ==
- Barnett, Hilaire (2009). Constitutional & Administrative Law (7th ed.). Abingdon, Oxfordshire: Routledge-Cavendish. ISBN 978-1-003-15563-8.
