= Declarations of war by Great Britain and the United Kingdom =

A declaration of war is a formal declaration issued by a national government indicating that a state of war exists between that nation and another.

== Background ==
In the United Kingdom, the government and command of the armed forces is vested in the sovereign. Under the sovereign, direct control of the armed forces is divided between the government and the Defence Council. However, a constitutional convention has developed regarding parliamentary approval for military action.

There has been a long-running debate regarding whether Parliament alone should have the power to declare war and more widely to commit British forces to armed conflict. This was attempted (to the limited extent of possible war against Iraq) in 1999 with the introduction of the Military Action Against Iraq (Parliamentary Approval) Bill. However Queen Elizabeth II, acting upon the advice of her government at the time, refused to grant her consent to allow the bill to be debated in Parliament and so it was dropped (Queen's Consent was needed before debate could take place because the bill affected the royal prerogative). The Constitutional Reform and Governance Act 2010 originally included a section that would have required Parliamentary approval for use of the armed forces, but this was dropped from the bill before royal assent.

There have been no declarations of war since the Second World War (against Thailand in 1942, to be precise), though British Armed Forces have taken part in armed conflict on numerous occasions nonetheless. A committee of the House of Lords opined that the prohibition on initiating violent conflict in the Charter of the United Nations has made declaration of war redundant as a formal international legal instrument.

The procedure for a declaration of war is set out in a letter dated 23 August 1939 from Gerald Fitzmaurice. It reads:

Mr Harvey [Halifax's Private Secretary to whom Fitzmaurice's reply was sent].

The Secretary of State's enquiry about how we declare war. The method of procedure is to deliver a declaration of war to the diplomatic representative in London of the enemy Power or Powers at such hour as may be decided upon by the Cabinet and to obtain a receipt recording the time of delivery. The declaration is delivered by a special messenger who should take with him the special passports covering the enemy representative, his family and personal staff and his diplomatic staff and their families. These are now being drafted on the assumption that war would in the first place be only declared on Germany and the Secretary of State would have to sign them.

It is not possible to state definitely at present what the terms of the declaration of war itself would be as these must depend upon circumstances. It is quite likely that our declaration of war might be preceded by an ultimatum which would be delivered in Berlin. This might e.g. take the form that if by a certain time the German Government had not given an assurance that they would proceed no further with their violation of Polish territory the Ambassador had instructed to ask for his passports and that His Majesty's Government would have to take such steps as might seem good to them. In such a case our actual declaration of war on the expiry of the time limit would take the form of notifying the German Embassy that no satisfactory reply having received from the German Government, His Majesty's Government considered that a state of war between the two countries existed as from a certain time.

I understand that the declaration would be drafted in consultation with the Dominions Office.

Once the declaration has been delivered a lot of consequential results follow, such as informing the other Government Departments that war has been declared and giving the same information to the diplomatic representatives in London of non-enemy powers and so forth. Standing drafts for all these purposes exist.

== Declarations of war by the Kingdom of Great Britain ==
The following table refers to declarations of war from the Act of Union in 1707 until the creation of the United Kingdom of Great Britain and Ireland in 1801.

| War or conflict | Opponent(s) | Initial authorisation | Declaration | Monarch | Prime Minister | Conclusion |
|---|---|---|---|---|---|---|
| War of the Quadruple Alliance | Spain | 17 December 1718 | | George I | None | Treaty of The Hague, 17 February 1720. |
| War of Jenkins' Ear | Spain | 23 October 1739 | | George II | Robert Walpole | Treaty of Aix-la-Chapelle, 18 October 1748. |
| War of the Austrian Succession | (Kingdom of France) France | 31 March 1744 | | George II | Henry Pelham | Treaty of Aix-la-Chapelle, 18 October 1748. |
| Seven Years' War | (Kingdom of France) France | 17 May 1756 | Declaration on France | George II | Thomas Pelham-Holles | Treaty of Paris, 10 February 1763. British victory. |
| Seven Years' War | Spain | 4 January 1762 | Declaration on Spain | George III | Thomas Pelham-Holles | Treaty of Paris, 10 February 1763. British victory. |
| American Revolutionary War | (Kingdom of France) France | 17 March 1778 | Declaration on France | George III | Lord North | Treaty of Versailles, 3 September 1783. |
| American Revolutionary War | Spain | 1779 | Declaration on Spain | George III | Lord North | Treaty of Versailles, 3 September 1783. |
| Fourth Anglo-Dutch War | Dutch Republic | December 1780 | Declaration on the Dutch Republic | George III | Lord North | Treaty of Paris, 20 May 1784. |

== Declarations of war by the United Kingdom ==
The following table refers to declarations of war since the creation of the United Kingdom in 1801. In 1927 the United Kingdom of Great Britain and Ireland was renamed the "United Kingdom of Great Britain and Northern Ireland".

| War or conflict | Opponent(s) | Initial authorisation | Declaration | Monarch | Prime Minister | Conclusion |
|---|---|---|---|---|---|---|
| Napoleonic Wars | France | 18 May 1803 | | George III | Henry Addington | Treaty of Paris (1815) and Congress of Vienna |
| Crimean War | Russia | 28 March 1854 | Declaration on the Russian Empire | Victoria | Earl of Aberdeen | Treaty of Paris, 30 March 1856 |
| Bhutan War | Bhutan | November 1864 | Declaration on Bhutan | Victoria | Viscount Palmerston | Treaty of Sinchula, 11 November 1865 |
| Anglo-Zulu War | Zulu Kingdom | 18 March 1879 | Ultimatum by Sir Henry Bartle Frere | Victoria | Benjamin Disraeli | The war ended the Zulu nation's independence. |
| Anglo-Zanzibar War | Zanzibar | 27 August 1896 | Ultimatum by Rear-Admiral Harry Rawson | Victoria | Marquess of Salisbury | The war replaced Khalid bin Barghash as Sultan with Hamoud bin Mohammed, leading to the abolition of slavery. |
| First World War | (German Empire) Germany | 4 August 1914 | Declaration on Germany | George V | H. H. Asquith | Armistice with Germany, 11 November 1918. Treaty of Versailles, 28 June 1919. |
| First World War | Austria-Hungary | 12 August 1914 | Declaration on Austria-Hungary | George V | H. H. Asquith | Austria: Treaty of Saint-Germain-en-Laye, 10 September 1919. Hungary: Treaty of Trianon, 4 June 1920. |
| First World War | Ottoman Empire | 5 November 1914 | Declaration on the Ottoman Empire | George V | H. H. Asquith | Treaty of Lausanne, 24 July 1923. |
| First World War | (Tsardom of Bulgaria (1908–1946)) Bulgaria | 15 October 1915 | Declaration on Bulgaria | George V | H. H. Asquith | Treaty of Neuilly-sur-Seine, 27 November 1919. |
| Second World War | (Nazi Germany) Germany | 3 September 1939 | British declaration of war on Germany (1939) | George VI | Neville Chamberlain | Treaty on the Final Settlement with Respect to Germany, 12 September 1990. The Potsdam Agreement on 2 August 1945 agreed the subdivision of Germany following the surrender on 8 May 1945. Austria was part of Germany when War was declared, and was formally re-established by the Treaty of Vienna on 15 May 1955. |
| Second World War | (Kingdom of Italy) Italy | 11 June 1940 | Declaration on Italy | George VI | Winston Churchill | Armistice with Italy, 3 September 1943. The final peace treaty between Italy and the Allies was signed in Paris on 10 February 1947. |
| Second World War | Finland | 5 December 1941 | Declaration on Finland | George VI | Winston Churchill | Moscow Armistice, 19 September 1944. The final peace treaty between Finland and the Allies was signed in Paris on 10 February 1947. |
| Second World War | Hungary | 5 December 1941 | Declaration on Hungary | George VI | Winston Churchill | The final peace treaty between Hungary and the Allies was signed in Paris on 10 February 1947. |
| Second World War | (Kingdom of Romania) Romania | 5 December 1941 | Declaration on Romania | George VI | Winston Churchill | Armistice with Romania, 12 September 1944. The final peace treaty between Romania and the Allies was signed in Paris on 10 February 1947. |
| Second World War | (Empire of Japan) Japan | 8 December 1941 | Declaration on Japan | George VI | Winston Churchill | Treaty of San Francisco, 8 September 1951. This followed the Surrender of Japan on 15 August 1945 and the Occupation of Japan which began on 28 August 1945. |
| Second World War | (Tsardom of Bulgaria (1908–1946)) Bulgaria | 13 December 1941 | Declaration on Bulgaria | George VI | Winston Churchill | Armistice with Bulgaria, 28 October 1944. The final peace treaty between Bulgaria and the Allies was signed in Paris on 10 February 1947. |
| Second World War | Thailand | 25 January 1942 | Declaration on Thailand | George VI | Winston Churchill | Anglo-Thai Peace Treaty, 1 January 1946 |

== See also ==
- Declaration of war
- Undeclared war
- Lists of wars involving the United Kingdom
- Declaration of war by Canada
- Declaration of war by the United States
- Constitution of the United Kingdom
