= UK parliamentary approval for military action =

In 2011, the government of the United Kingdom acknowledged that a constitutional convention had developed whereby the House of Commons should have an opportunity to debate the matter before troops are committed. It said that it proposed to observe that convention except when there was an emergency and such action would not be appropriate.

In the United Kingdom, the monarch is the Head of the Armed Forces and the decision to deploy the armed forces in situations of armed conflict is currently a prerogative power. Constitutional convention requires that, in the event of a commitment of the armed forces to military action, typically authorisation of the monarch is announced by the Prime Minister, on behalf of the Crown. Decisions on military action of the monarch are issued within the Cabinet with advice. The monarch's Defence Council has power of command over members of the armed forces.

Parliamentary control over the armed forces is primarily based on the need of Acts of Parliament authorized by the monarch which govern enlistment and discipline to be annually renewed and approved by the monarch. Additionally, Acts of Parliament also affect the use of armed forces within the United Kingdom.

== Constitutional background ==
The legal right to send the UK armed forces to war is part of the royal prerogative. These powers were originally the "personal powers" of the monarch, but over time a convention has been established that most are used on advice of government ministers. As the monarch increasingly relied on the advice of their ministers, and those ministers took responsibility for policy, the powers were effectively delegated to the ministers themselves.

The King's or Queen's Regulations for the Army state that the governance and command of the armed forces are vested in the monarch, who gives the Secretary of State responsibility for general defence, and the Defence Committee responsibility for the armed forces. Constitutional convention requires that the declaration of war or commitment of British armed forces is authorised by the Prime Minister on behalf of the Crown. Parliament has no official constitutional role in the process. However, ministers are still accountable to Parliament for the actions they take.

Parliament does have the power to change the royal prerogative. The Bill of Rights 1689 gave Parliament the ability to abolish a power or place it on statutory footing instead. Any proposed law which does affect prerogative powers requires the King or Queen's Consent, although the armed forces, as servants of the King, can sometimes be a special case.

== Role of Parliament since the Second World War ==
Since World War Two there have been many illustrative examples of when military force has been used, indicating the opportunities for debate. In 1939 the U.K. declared war against Germany. Before the motion was put and carried, other members responded to the Prime Minister's speech in a short debate.

There were many statements and debates throughout the war, and the bulk of the debates were on motions to adjourn. However, there were a number of debates on substantive motions including one which was moved on 6 May 1941 (the debate concluded the next day) approving the Government’s policy in sending assistance to Greece and expressing confidence that operations in the Middle East.

Another debate which was held in the House of Commons on 2 August 1956 relating Britain's position in the Eastern Mediterranean, was not followed by a vote. A subsequent vote did take place when the House was recalled on 12–13 September 1956 to debate the Suez situation. However, it was on a motion endorsing the Government's approach to resolving the crisis and was not specifically to approve deploying British forces to the region. Therefore it has never been considered a precedent in this matter.

During the Gulf War of 1991 there were seven statements and one debate, which was on a substantive motion. The commencement of hostilities was announced in a statement by then Prime Minister John Major on 17 January 1991 and a debate took place on 21 January. The Government accepted an Opposition amendment, which was put and agreed to on division.

As early as 1999, the anti-war MP Tam Dalyell had proposed a Ten Minute Rule Bill called Military Action Against Iraq (Parliamentary Approval) Bill to "require the prior approval, by a simple majority of the House of Commons, of military action by British forces against Iraq." Dalyell was given leave to bring in his Bill, but it could not be debated and voted upon because as a Bill that affected the Royal Prerogative, the Queen's Consent was needed before it could be debated in Parliament. The Government advised Queen Elizabeth II to refuse to grant consent, which she did, as constitutional convention requires.

Parliament was recalled on 24 September 2002 to debate the situation in Iraq and the possible recourse to military action. Between September 2002 and March 2003 there were two further Government debates on Iraq and eleven statements, plus two debates on defence in the world, during which mention was made of the ongoing situation. Military operations subsequently commenced on 20 March 2003. By the end of major combat operations on 1 May 2003 a further nine ministerial statements and three written ministerial statements had been made. The Iraq conflict in 2003 was the first example in modern times of prior parliamentary approval having been sought, and granted. As such it was regarded by advocates of a formal role for Parliament as setting a precedent for any future decisions on military action.

There have been calls for this informal convention to be strengthened and made law by the Political & Constitutional Reform Committee. However the Lords Constitution Committee feel that the current status and strength of parliament is sufficient, and see no need for it being made statute.

In 2018, the UK government carried out air strikes on Syria without prior parliamentary approval. At the time, Parliament was in recess. In the ensuing parliamentary debate, some, like Leader of the Opposition Jeremy Corbyn, were critical of the government, accusing it of "...attempting to overturn that democratic advance."

== See also ==
- British Parliamentary approval for the invasion of Iraq
- Constitutional convention
- Military Action Against Iraq (Parliamentary Approval) Bill
