= British parliamentary approval for the invasion of Iraq =

March 2003 proceedings in the House of Commons

British parliamentary approval for the invasion of Iraq was given by the elected members of the House of Commons to Tony Blair's government on the eve of the 2003 invasion of Iraq, in a series of two votes, on 18 March 2003.

== Constitutional background ==
There is no constitutional requirement for the Crown to seek any explicit form of parliamentary approval before committing British forces to military action. By virtue of the royal prerogative, the Sovereign may give the order to commence military action, which is customarily given on the advice of His Majesty's Government.

However the political controversy over whether to participate in military action, which covered the legal legitimacy as well as foreign policy questions, had been under discussion for years. As early as 1999, the anti-war MP, Tam Dalyell had proposed a Ten Minute Rule Bill called Military Action Against Iraq (Parliamentary Approval) Bill to "require the prior approval, by a simple majority of the House of Commons, of military action by British forces against Iraq". Dalyell was given leave to bring in his Bill, but it could not be debated and voted upon because as a Bill that affected the royal prerogative, the consent of the Queen was needed before it could be debated in Parliament (known as Queen's Consent). The government advised Queen Elizabeth II to withhold consent, which she did, as constitutional convention requires.

== Debates in 2003 before 18 March ==
The deployments of UK forces to Saudi Arabia and Kuwait, along with forces of the United States, were a clear precursor to military action. Several debates were held on Britain's Iraq policy. Finally, on 17 March 2003, US President Bush gave an ultimatum to Saddam Hussein to leave power within 48 hours or face military action. Previous votes had endorsed government policy of confronting Iraq through the UN.

== Debate of 18 March ==
The sovereign has the power to declare war, as an exercise of the royal prerogative, without the approval of Parliament. Before or after the start of previous wars, there had normally been debate in Parliament; however for the first time a vote was held, allowing Parliament to signify its position in regards to a declaration of war, even though it was, "purely symbolic" and "not binding on the government". The debate was held on 18 March 2003, and lasted from midday to 10 pm, at which time the two parliamentary votes were held.

Of the three largest UK-wide parties in Parliament, both the Labour and Conservative parties were committed to approving the invasion, but a quarter of Labour MPs voted against the invasion. However, the Liberal Democrats, which had one in twelve of the MPs in parliament, were opposed to the invasion, and its MPs voted against it. The then-Leader of the Liberal Democrats, Charles Kennedy, made clear his opposition to the war at a 'Stop the War' rally in London's Hyde Park, in front of thousands of attendees, before the War began.

Given the backing of the Conservative Party for the invasion of Iraq, there was not much doubt that the bill would pass. The more important question was whether or not the Government would secure a majority of Labour MPs' votes for the bill. Had a majority of Labour MPs voted against the bill or abstained, then the Prime Minister's position and the survival of the government would have been imperiled: multiple Labour ministers would have resigned, including the Prime Minister Tony Blair, who suggested in his speech that he would resign if the vote was not passed.

Frontbench members of a party by tradition must resign from that position before they can vote against their party. The expected mass of resignations from among some of the ranks of these parties did not materialise beyond the resignation of Robin Cook.

The government proposed a motion in Parliament, stating:

This House notes its decisions of 25 November 2002 and 26 February 2003 to endorse UN Security Council Resolution 1441; recognises that Iraq's weapons of mass destruction and long range missiles, and its continuing non-compliance with Security Council Resolutions, pose a threat to international peace and security; notes that in the 130 days since Resolution 1441 was adopted Iraq has not co-operated actively, unconditionally and immediately with the weapons inspectors, and has rejected the final opportunity to comply and is in further material breach of its obligations under successive mandatory UN Security Council Resolutions; regrets that despite sustained diplomatic effort by Her Majesty's Government it has not proved possible to secure a second Resolution in the UN because one Permanent Member of the Security Council made plain in public its intention to use its veto whatever the circumstances; notes the opinion of the Attorney General that, Iraq having failed to comply and Iraq being at the time of Resolution 1441 and continuing to be in material breach, the authority to use force under Resolution 678 has revived and so continues today; believes that the United Kingdom must uphold the authority of the United Nations as set out in Resolution 1441 and many Resolutions preceding it, and therefore supports the decision of Her Majesty's Government that the United Kingdom should use all means necessary to ensure the disarmament of Iraq's weapons of mass destruction; offers wholehearted support to the men and women of Her Majesty's Armed Forces now on duty in the Middle East; in the event of military operations requires that, on an urgent basis, the United Kingdom should seek a new Security Council Resolution that would affirm Iraq's territorial integrity, ensure rapid delivery of humanitarian relief, allow for the earliest possible lifting of UN sanctions, an international reconstruction programme, and the use of all oil revenues for the benefit of the Iraqi people and endorse an appropriate post-conflict administration for Iraq, leading to a representative government which upholds human rights and the rule of law for all Iraqis; and also welcomes the imminent publication of the Quartet's roadmap as a significant step to bringing a just and lasting peace settlement between Israelis and Palestinians and for the wider Middle East region, and endorses the role of Her Majesty's Government in actively working for peace between Israel and Palestine.

An amendment was proposed urging the executive to wait for further UN approval. It removed the text "recognises that Iraq's weapons ... in the Middle East" and replaced it with:

This House... believes that the case for war against Iraq has not yet been established, especially given the absence of specific United Nations authorisation; but, in the event that hostilities do commence, pledges its total support for the British forces engaged in the Middle East, expresses its admiration for their courage, skill and devotion to duty, and hopes that their tasks will be swiftly concluded with minimal casualties on all sides...

Parliament voted on the amended text in a vote at 9:15 pm, but the amendment was defeated by 396 to 217 votes.

At 10 pm, the motion without the amendment was passed by 412 to 149 votes, therefore signifying Parliament's approval of an invasion. The British military campaign against Iraq, known as Operation Telic, began one day later.

18 March 2003; That HM Government should use all means necessary to ensure the disarmament of Iraq's weapons of mass destruction Absolute majority: 330/659
Vote	Parties	Votes
Aye	Labour Party (254), Conservative Party (146), Ulster Unionist Party (6), Democratic Unionist Party (5), Independent Conservative (1)	412 / 659
No	Labour Party (84), Liberal Democrats (52), Scottish National Party (5), Plaid Cymru (4), Conservative Party (2), Independent Community and Health Concern (1), Social Democratic and Labour Party (1)	149 / 659
Abstentions	Speaker of the House (1), Labour Party (69), Conservative Party (17), Sinn Féin (4), Social Democratic and Labour Party (2), Liberal Democrats (1)	94 / 659
Tellers	Labour Party (3), Conservative Party (1); not counted in vote totals	4 / 659

== See also ==
- American congressional approval for the invasion of Iraq
- Command responsibility
- Gulf of Tonkin Resolution
- Iraq Inquiry
- Iraq War
- Jus ad bellum
- Just war theory
- Legality of the Iraq War
- Legitimacy of the 2003 invasion of Iraq
- Rationale for the Iraq War
- United Nations
- United Nations Charter
- Views on the 2003 invasion of Iraq
- War of aggression
- War on terror
