= Hospital Doctors Union =

British trade union

HDU
- Hospital Consultants and Specialists Association
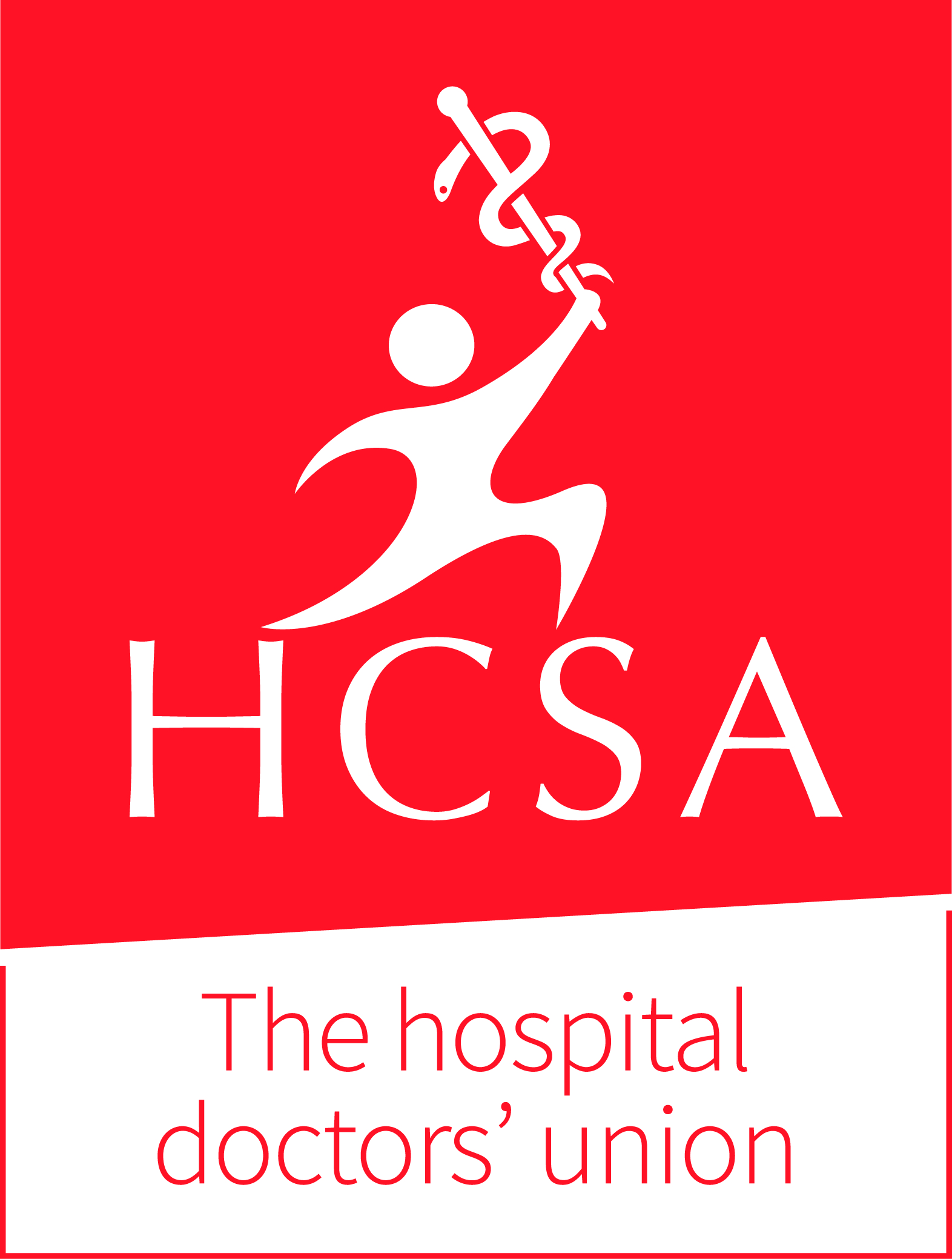
- Founded: 1948; 78 years ago
- Headquarters: Basingstoke, Hampshire
- Location: United Kingdom
- Members: ▼2,894 (2024)
- President: Dr Claudia Paoloni
- General Secretary: Martin Bond
- Affiliations: TUC, STUC GFTU
- Website: hcsa.com

The Hospital Doctors Union (HDU), previously known as the Hospital Consultants and Specialists Association (HCSA) is a nationally recognised professional association and trade union in the UK dedicated solely to hospital consultants, SAS grade doctors and resident doctors (specialty hospital doctors in training and Foundation grades), originally established in 1948 as the Regional Hospital Consultants and Specialists Association. Medical students can also join as associates.

The association publishes a bi-monthly magazine for members, Hospital Consultant & Specialist.

== History ==
The organisation was founded in 1948 as the Regional Hospital Consultants and Specialists Association (RHCSA) to represent the interests of hospital doctors working in non-teaching hospitals.

In 1974 the association's rules were amended to extend membership rights to all senior hospital doctors, and its members voted for a new name, the Hospital Consultants and Specialists Association, to reflect this change.

The HDU has been affiliated to the Trades Union Congress (TUC) since 1979. It is also affiliated to the General Federation of Trade Unions (UK).

On 25 June 2013 HDU (then HCSA) attended is first meeting of the NHS Staff Council, a body containing representatives of staff-side unions and NHS employers. In April 2018, the HCSA AGM endorsed Dr Claudia Paoloni as President-elect. When she took up her post in 2019 she became the first ever woman President in the association's history.

It was granted national collective bargaining rights for all grades of hospital doctors in England by NHS Employers on 22 December 2016. This is the first time any trade union for doctors other than the British Medical Association has been nationally recognised by the NHS.

In 2026 the organisation formally changed its name to the Hospital Doctors Union.

== Membership ==
The association has admitted hospital specialty doctors in training ("junior doctors") since a rule change announced on 1 May 2013.

On 28 April 2017 members voted for a rule change that extended membership further to encompass all post-graduate hospital doctors, including Foundation grades for the first time.

== Organisational structure ==
Every two years HDU members elect members to the National Executive Committee, with representation based on districts. Currently there are 9 geographical constituencies, each with the right to elect a representative to the NEC. There is one reserved NEC seat each for Resident Doctor and SAS doctor grades. The president is directly elected, first as vice-president where they serve a one-year term prior to becoming president for a year. They continue to serve as an NEC member for a third year as past president.

The Executive's current membership comprises:

- President Dr Claudia Paoloni FRCA
- General Secretary Martin Bond
- Vice President Dr Anna Beattie
- Past President Dr Naru Narayanan FRCOG

== 2014-15 NHS pay dispute ==
On 28 July 2014 a consultative ballot of the then-HCSA members was announced over the government's decision to ignore a Review Body on Doctors' and Dentists' Remuneration (DDRB) recommendation of a 1 per cent pay rise for all NHS staff.

An extraordinary meeting of the HCSA executive met to consider the results of the ballot, which closed on 18 August 2014, after 80 per cent of those voting backed some form of industrial action. The executive subsequently voted to hold a formal ballot on industrial action.

In the wake of the consultative ballot results HCSA President Professor John Schofield said: "Doctors have only very rarely indicated any willingness to undertake industrial action, and it demonstrates the strength of feeling within our profession. We will continue to listen to our members and represent their views to NHS Employers. I hope that we can encourage further dialogue between the government, employers and unions to avoid the possibility of action.”

HCSA members mounted industrial action in the form of "work to rule" alongside other health unions in October 2014.

== 2015 Consultants' Contract ==
On 16 July 2015 the DDRB published its recommendations following an independent review of the Consultants' Contract and the Doctors in Training Contract.

In the wake of the report, on 30 July 2015, HCSA stated its position In Favour of A Safe Seven-Day Service, highlighting the need for the principles of safety, fairness and work-life balance to be maintained in any changes.

== 2015 Junior Doctors Dispute ==
On 5 October 2015, then HCSA General Secretary Eddie Saville set out the association's position calling for A Fair Deal for Doctors In Training.

Explaining the HCSA position, he said: "As with our position on the consultant aspect of the DDRB proposals currently being pursued by the government and employers, this stance is guided by the principle that any successful outcome must balance safety, fairness and work-life balance. It must also meet the recruitment and retention test needed to ensure that the health service remains properly staffed. What's more any attempt to impose contractual changes on doctors in training is completely unacceptable, flying in the face of the basic tenets of trade unionism - that negotiation not imposition is the way to bring about a positive outcome that delivers for trainee doctors, patients and the health service as a whole."
