= Armed Forces' Pay Review Body =

United Kingdom non-departmental public body

The Armed Forces' Pay Review Body is a United Kingdom non-departmental public body (and a Review Body) established to review and recommend the pay and terms and conditions of employment of the British armed forces. It is funded by the Ministry of Defence, and the Office of Manpower Economics provides the Review Body with an independent Secretariat.

The Review Body is to have regard for the need for the pay of the Armed Forces to be broadly comparable with pay levels in civilian life. Its reports and recommendations are submitted jointly to the Secretary of State for Defence and the Prime Minister.

The AFPRB has an independent chairman and deputy chairman appointed by the Prime Minister, whose roles are to supply an independent voice in all negotiations. In 2013 the chairman's appointment was not renewed after the government rejected his call for a rise of half of one percent in the "X-factor" to compensate for Coalition defence cuts. The Chief Executive of the Army Families Federation described the failure to renew his appointment as a punitive "sacking" based on Smith's defiance of an order to limit pay rises for the military.

Chairmen of the AFPRB have included:

- Sir Harold Atcherley (1971 - 1982)
- Professor David Greenaway (2004 - 2010)
- Professor Alasdair Smith (2010 - 2013)

The AFPRB is registered with the Information Commissioner as a data controller. Its registration number is Z5900513.
