= Police Negotiating Board =

The Police Negotiating Board (PNB) was a United Kingdom non-departmental public body established by Act of Parliament in 1980 to negotiate the pay and terms and conditions of employment of the British police. It was funded by the Home Office, and the Office of Manpower Economics provided the Board with an independent Secretariat. It was replaced by the Police Remuneration Review Body (PRRB) on 1 October 2014 in England and Wales but remained active in Scotland. The PNB has an independent chairman and deputy chairman appointed by the Prime Minister, whose roles were to supply an independent voice in all negotiations.

Chairmen of the PNB included:

- Sir Harold Atcherley (1983 - 1986)

When agreement between the Staff Side and the Official Side cannot be reached after negotiation, nor subsequently resolved through conciliation, the relevant issues are referred to the Police Arbitration Tribunal (PAT). Awards by the PAT have the status of a recommendation by the PNB as if it were an agreement by both sides, so they are effectively binding on both the Staff and the Official sides of PNB due to paragraph 39 of the PNB Constitution, as noted by Lord Justice Keene in the judicial review of the Home Secretary's decision. However, such decisions are not binding on the Home Secretary, demonstrated by her decision on the 2007 police pay award, which was set aside for officers in England and Wales, who received 1.9% instead, although the award was implemented in full in Scotland. She stated that this necessary to maintain has not responded to comparisons of her decision to that of the Minister for Education, Ed Balls, who implemented a 2.5% pay award in full for all teachers.

There is cross-party concern that the Government's handling of the 2007 police pay award is seriously undermining the Police Negotiating Board machinery, and a national ballot of police officers by the Police Federation resulted in 86% of officers calling for the Police Federation of England and Wales to start to lobby for a change in legislation to allow police officers full industrial rights. Over 200 Members of Parliament have signed an Early Day Motion calling on the Government to reconsider its decision. The Motion was tabled by Home Affairs Select Committee Chairman Keith Vaz - a Labour MP — who has stated that:

The Government’s decision weakens the arbitration panel’s power and role. Without trust and respect for the decision on both sides, arbitration becomes meaningless. The Government’s case is weakening by the day... The Home Secretary and the Prime Minister have continuously defended the Government’s decision by arguing that pay awards must be kept in line with the Government’s targets on inflation — not on police funding, which would have been understandable — yet we heard from the chief constable of Nottinghamshire police that the 2.5 per cent. was in his budget and that he was ready to pay it... the potential effect on inflation seems minimal, especially as the Government have decided to pay PCSOs — who work with officers — and police desk staff the full 2.5 per cent.

— Keith Vaz MP,
