= PRRB =

PRRB may refer to:

- Police Remuneration Review Body, a United Kingdom Review Body
- Prayagraj Rambagh railway station, Uttar Pradesh, India, by Indian Railways station code
