= British Medical Association =

Registered trade union for doctors

- Abbreviation: BMA
- Predecessor: Provincial Medical and Surgical Association
- Founded: July 9, 1832; 194 years ago
- Founder: Charles Hastings
- Headquarters: Tavistock Square, London, England
- Region served: United Kingdom
- Members: ▲194,147 (2024)
- Chair: Tom Dolphin
- Deputy Chair: Emma Runswick
- Publication: The BMJ
- Website: bma.org.uk

The British Medical Association (BMA) is a registered trade union and professional body for doctors in the United Kingdom. It does not regulate or certify doctors, a responsibility which lies with the General Medical Council. The BMA has a range of representative and scientific committees and is recognised by National Health Service (NHS) employers alongside the Hospital Consultants and Specialists Association as one of two national contract negotiators for doctors.

The BMA's stated aim is "to promote the medical and allied sciences, and to maintain the honour and interests of the medical profession".

== History ==
=== Provincial Medical and Surgical Association and Webster's Medical Association ===
The British Medical Association traces its origins to the Provincial Medical and Surgical Association (PMSA), founded by Sir Charles Hastings on 19 July 1832, and to the "British Medical Association" founded by George Webster in 1836. Ten years after its initial meeting the Provincial Medical and Surgical Association's membership had grown to 1,350 and it had begun to publish a weekly journal, The Provincial Medical and Surgical Journal. In 1853 the PMSA extended its membership to London doctors and 1856 transformed itself into the British Medical Association. From 1857 their journal was known as the British Medical Journal or BMJ.

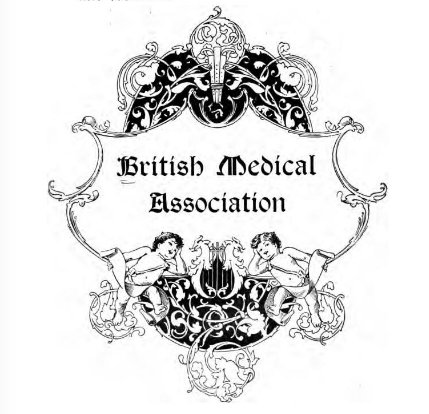
Logo used for the BMA's Sixty-fifth Annual Meeting, Montreal, 1897

Although not initially formed with the aim of initiating medical reform, the BMA played a key role in the drafting and passing of the Medical Act 1858, which established the General Medical Council and set a standard for qualified and unqualified doctors and established a system of professional regulation. Prior to this anyone, qualified or not, could practice as a doctor. This also positioned the BMA to play a major role in future medical politics, campaigning on issues such as Poor Law Medicine, quackery, public health, alternative and military medicine, and contract practice. During this time one of the most active and influential of the association's bodies was the Parliamentary Bills Committee, formed in 1863 to take a leading role in influencing legislation on public health matters.

=== Early 20th century ===
In May 1911 the Government introduced the National Health Insurance Bill which presented the BMA with new challenges. This bill introduced the idea that for a maximum contribution of four pence a week every employed person in the country could be insured against treatment costs for sickness. The BMA supported the principle but had a number of reservations about the scheme including the lack of doctor involvement in delivering the medical benefits, which were instead being delivered by friendly societies and trade unions. In response the BMA produced "Six Cardinal Points" which it felt should be included in any legislation.

At the BMA's general meeting in July 1912, incoming president Sir James Barr condemned the National Health Insurance Bill as "the most gigantic fraud which had ever been perpetrated on the public since the South Sea Bubble." Addressing "a large and distinguished audience," Barr "spoke eloquently and forcibly in favour of the improvement of the race by attention to eugenics, and pointed out the necessity of preventing disease as well of curing it. No serious attempt, he said, had yet been made to prevent the race from being carried on by its least worthy citizens." Barr explained that: "If such an attempt was to be successful we must begin with the unborn. The race must be renewed from the mentally and physically fit, and moral and physical degenerates should not be allowed to take any part in adding to it".

Ultimately the final bill was passed in 1913 in which four of the six points had been included. This resulted in an income limit of £2 per week being set to join the scheme, there was to be free choice of doctor by patient, the payment to the doctor should be adequate, and finally there should be adequate medical representation among the various bodies working on the Act.

With the start of World War I, the BMA formed a Central Medical War Committee (CMWC), and was given responsibility by the government for managing the demand for doctors in the armed forces whilst maintaining a full medical service for civilians. The BMA repeated this role during World War II. During this time the BMA also campaigned on issues such as the production and marketing of "secret remedies", nutrition and physical fitness, the relationship of alcohol to road accidents, and the medical aspects of abortion. The BMA had a Committee on Nutrition, who in 1934 published a report on minimum nutritional requirements, referred to in an interview with Marjorie Soper, an employee of Eleanor Rathbone, talking about her work on children's nutrition.

Early in the Second World War, the BMA became aware of the need for a change in the provision of medical care to the public after the end of the war and during peacetime, so shortly after the war, the BMA had produced its own plan for a "general medical service for the nation".

After the Labour Party won the 1945 general election and formed a government under Clement Attlee pledging national health insurance, the BMA spent three years negotiating with Health Minister Aneurin Bevan to allow the continuation of capitation fees, private practice, and paybeds under the new National Health Service.

During the 7 July 2005 London bombings a London Buses route 30 double decker bus exploded near the BMA headquarters on Upper Woburn Place, damaging it. After the explosion, some medical professionals in the building were able to assist police and ambulance personnel.

== Membership ==
As of August 2024 the BMA had 195,000 members.

It is officially recognised by the British government and by the Review Body on Doctors' and Dentists' Remuneration. The BMA has sole national bargaining rights for most groups of doctors although, for consultants, these are shared with the Hospital Consultants and Specialists Association (HCSA).

Members of the BMA have access to employment advice, covering subjects including contract checking, job planning, pay disputes and relationship issues.

Members also receive a subscription to The BMJ, and other associated resources.

== ARM, Council, and committees ==
As part of the representative remit of the BMA, it has a number of representative committees formed from members elected at the Annual Representatives Meeting (ARM) and via other election processes. The most senior of these is Council, which meets five times a year to implement policy as decided at the ARM and to take relevant decisions during the year. Council has 34 voting members, led by the Chair who is elected by council for an initial term of three years and to a maximum of five.

The Board of Professional Activities reports to Council and considers ethical, scientific, research, and educational matters whilst The Board of Representative and Political Activities considers reports from the following committees which represent doctors across the seven branches of practice, namely:

- Consultants Committee (CC) – representing senior hospital doctors
- General Practitioners Committee (GPC) – representing NHS General Practitioners (GPs) and GP trainees throughout their training
- Junior Doctors Committee (JDC) – representing junior hospital doctors
- Medical Academic Staff Committee (MASC) – representing academic and research staff
- Medical Students Committee (MSC) – representing medical students
- Public Health Medicine Committee (PHMC) – representing public and community health doctors
- Staff and Associate Specialists Committee(SASC) – for doctors in the non consultant career grades.

Branch of Practice committees have a majority of BMA members but may also include non-members. All members are elected. These UK committees are mirrored across the devolved nations of Scotland, Wales, and Northern Ireland.

=== Medical Ethics Committee ===
The BMA has a Medical Ethics Committee provides guidance to the association on current and developing issues in medical ethics. The committee debates issues of principle including those touching on:

=== Armed Forces Committee ===
The BMA supports armed forces doctors through its Armed Forces Committee (AFC) which represents clinicians in all parts of the armed forces, whether they are deployed to war zones, acting as reservists or civilian doctors employed by the Ministry of Defence. A large part of the AFC's work is the production of evidence to the Armed Forces Pay Review Body (AFPRB). The AFPRB advises on remuneration for members of the naval, military, and air forces. Further to this work, the AFC negotiates with the Ministry of Defence on the terms and conditions for civilian doctors. The committee holds two conferences a year; an Armed Forces Committee conference usually in May and a Civilian Doctors' conference usually in October.

=== Private Practice Committee ===
The BMA supports doctors that undertake private practice outside the NHS through its Private Practice Committee. This body considers topics facing both private consultants and general practitioners. The committee meets three times a year and holds conferences in relation to private practice. The main issues currently being dealt with by the committee include looking at the implementation of revalidation in the independent sector and addressing difficulties that doctors experience in relation to new ways of working by the private medical insurers.

=== Special Chloroform Committee ===
The Special Chloroform Committee of the British Medical Association (sometimes referred to as the "Third Chloroform Committee") was established in 1901 following the annual meeting of the British Medical Association and it produced its last final report 1910. The committee was instigated to investigate chloroform, which was a subject of great interest to the profession and the public at the time.

The committee was started with a budget of £100 and the committee was chaired by Dr. A. D. Waller, and consisted of Dr. Barr, Dr. Dudley Buxton, Sir Victor Horsley, Dr. Sherrington and Dr Walker (and later A. Vernon Hardcourt and Professor Dunstan) "to investigate methods of quantitatively determining the presence of chloroform in the air and the living body".

In their final report, the committee stated that chloroform doses above 2% were unsafe as cardiac arrest occurred under inhibition of the vagus nerve. They also selected a list of inhalers suitable for giving accurate measures of chloroform.

=== Other committees ===
The BMA also has a number of committees which represent other specialities and interests which affect its members, including:

- Medical Ethics
- Board of Medical Education
- Equality and Diversity Committee
- Pensions
- Armed Forces
- Civil and Public Services Committee
- International Committee
- Medico-Legal
- Occupational Health
- GP Registrars Subcommittee

== Headquarters ==
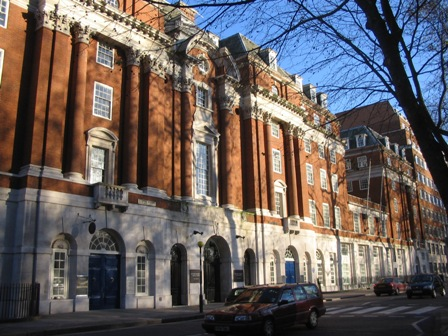
BMA House, London

BMA House has been the headquarters of the BMA since 1925, the association being previously housed at 429 The Strand since its move to London. In addition to offices for its staff, the building is used for BMA conferences and events and parts of the building are available on a private hire basis for events. The building, Grade II listed since 1982, was originally designed for the Theosophical Society by Sir Edwin Lutyens, with work commencing in September 1911. However the start of World War I interrupted construction and the Army Pay Office took over the uncompleted building. After the war the Theosophical Society could not afford to finish the building, and it was sold to the BMA for £50,000, with the association later purchasing the freehold of the site from the Bedford Estates in 1962.

After purchasing the building, the BMA commissioned Lutyens to complete the building to its specifications and it was officially opened by King George V and Queen Mary on 13 July 1925. However, plans were soon commissioned from Cyril Wontner Smith to extend the building to overlook Tavistock Square, and this was completed in 1929. The association later commissioned Douglas Wood to design further extensions on either side of Wontner Smith's front entrance (built 1938–1949), to the south (1947–1950) and at the back of the building (1959–1960).

A 1954 war memorial by James Woodford in the central courtyard – a bronze fountain in a stepped pool, with four stone statues – is Grade II* listed, and described by Historic England as a particularly good example of a Second World War memorial to a civilian profession.

== Chairs of BMA Council ==
- 1832-1865: Sir Charles Hastings
- 1865-1868: Francis Sibson
- 1868-1871: W.D. Husband
- 1871-1874: Geo. Southam
- 1874-1877: R.W. Falconer
- 1877-1880: Alfred Carpenter
- 1880-1883: C.G. Wheelhouse
- 1883-1886: Sir B. Walter Foster
- 1886-1889: Thos. Bridgwater
- 1889-1892: W. Withers Moore
- 1892-1895: John Ward Cousins
- 1895-1898: Professor Robert Saundby
- 1898-1901: John Roberts Thomson
- 1901-1904: Andrew Clark
- 1904-1906: Henry WM. Langley
- 1906-1910: Edmund Owen
- 1910-1920: James Alexander MacDonald
- 1920-1927: Sir Robert Alfred Bolam
- 1927-1934: Sir Henry Britten Brackenbury
- 1934-1939: Ernest Kaye Le Fleming
- 1939-1943: Henry Sessions Soutar
- 1943–1949: Sir Guy Dain
- 1949–1956: Edward Andrew Gregg
- 1956-1961: Solomon Wand
- 1961-1961: Ian Dingwall Grant
- 1961-1966: John Raymond Nicholson-Lailey
- 1966–1971: Sir Ronald Gibson
- 1971–1976: Walpole Sinclair Lewin
- 1976–1979: Sir James Cameron
- 1979-1984: Anthony Herbert Grabham
- 1984–1990: John Marks
- 1990–1993: Jeremy Lee-Potter
- 1993–1998: Sandy MacAra
- 1998–2003: Ian Bogle
- 2003–2007: James Johnson
- 2007–2012: Hamish Meldrum
- 2012–2017: Mark Porter
- 2017–2022: Chaand Nagpaul
- 2022–2025: Philip Banfield
- 2025–present: Tom Dolphin

== Controversy ==
In 2019, the BMA faced criticism after two leading general practitioners blew the whistle on sexism and harassment in the organisation. Following the independent Romney review which described the BMA as an "old boys club" that undervalued women, the BMA apologised to female doctors.

In 2024, the BMA was criticised by key medical figures for disavowing the final report of The Independent Review of Gender Identity Services for Children and Young People (commonly, Cass Review), which was accepted by the last government and its Labour party successor. The situation led to a split within the organisation, and resignations by long time members. Two months later, they announced that the organisation had adopted "a neutral position on the Cass Review" and its recommendations.

== Fair and ethical trade ==
The BMA's Medical Fair and Ethical Trade Group (MFETG) was established in 2007 and works to "investigate, promote and facilitate fair end ethical trade" in relation to medical commodities. The group has worked with Swedish-based NGO Swedwatch to investigate and report on supply chain concerns, particularly looking at working conditions in the production of surgical instruments in Sialkot in Pakistan. Working conditions for people producing surgical instruments, latex gloves, uniforms, surgical masks and condoms have been found to be unsafe and inadequate, with pay and passports held back from people working in northern Pakistan more broadly, and also among migrant workers in Malaysia.

== Grants ==
The BMA makes grants to doctors for research and other reasons. Details of all the awards and grants offered by The BMA are available on their website. However, the top three are listed here:

- Claire Wand Fund – a charitable fund, administered by The BMA, that makes grants to fund the further education of medical practitioners predominantly engaged in general practice.
- Humanitarian Fund – the BMA International Department runs the BMA Humanitarian Fund which offers grants of up to £3,000 for projects taking place in developing countries.
- BMA Research Grants – the BMA awards ten grants totalling £500,000 annually. All grants are for research in progress or prospective research and cover a diversity of research areas.

== Insignia ==
The logo of the BMA includes a stylised version of the rod of Asclepius, associated with Asclepius, the Greek god of healing. It was designed by John Lloyd (graphic designer) and Martin Skeet of the British design consultancy, Lloyd Northover.

Coat of arms of British Medical Association
Notes Granted 25 May 1955 Crest On a wreath of the colours in front of two torches in saltire Azure enflamed Proper a rod of Aesculapius Or. Escutcheon Per pale Or and Azure a maunch counterchanged on a chief of the first a lion passant also Azure. Supporters On the dexter side a figure representing Hippocrates holding in his exterior hand a pomegranate Proper and on the sinister side a figure representing William Harvey physician also Proper holding in his exterior hand an annulet per fesse Gules and Azure.

== Awards ==
- The BMA Medical Book awards are announced annually. There are awards in 20 subject categories (from "Anaesthesia" to "Surgical Specialities"); special category awards including "Illustrated book", "Student textbook", "Young author"; and an overall "Medical Book of the Year".
- The Association Medal is awarded to members for "outstanding and sustained services" to the BMA at national level
- Fellowship of the Association is awarded for "distinguished and notable" services to the BMA and the profession
- The Gold Medal is awarded to those who have "conspicuously raised the character of the medical profession". The medal was instituted in 1877 at the association's annual meeting in Manchester.

== See also ==
- World Medical Association
- The Doctors' Association UK
- British International Doctors Association
