= Ordination of women in the Church of England =

The ordination of women in the Church of England has gradually expanded over time. Initially springing from the movement for women's suffrage, the movement for the ordination of women within the Church of England became a distinct movement in its own right, continuing as of 2026.

== Background ==
The Church of England had historically prohibited the ordination of women. Gradually, between 1850 and 1987 women became able to take on roles such as chaplaincy.

Maude Royden had rose to fame campaigning for the ordination of women. She was not successful in convincing the Church of England to change its position on the matter. She went on to establish her own "religious centre" located in London.

The Church League for Women's Suffrage was established in 1909. There was a "vibrant" and "active" campaign for the ordination of women during the 1910 and 1935 period. The Church League for Women's Suffrage was renamed the League of the Church Militant in 1918, after the Representation of the People Act 1918. The Society for the Equal Ministry of Men and Women in the Church was established in 1928 following the Representation of the People Act (Equal Franchise) 1928. The Anglican Group for the Ordination of Women was established in 1929 and became the main group campaigning for the ordination of women.

The first woman to be ordained in the Anglican Communion was Florence Li Tim-Oi in 1944. She had been living in England due to the Japanese occupation of Hong Kong - until the end of the war, she was given a permission to officiate by the Archbishop of Canterbury.

In the 1970s, the Anglican Consultative Council passed Resolution 28, which stated that there were no "valid theological objections" to the ordination of women, and asked every national church to study the question.

In 1978, a motion to remove the barriers that prevented women from becoming priests in the Church of England failed. This led to the establishment of the Movement for the Ordination of Women.

During the post-war period, the Movement for the Ordination of Women was the main body campaigning for the ordination of women. Opposition to the ordination of women became more organised after the passage of the 1986 measure concerning deacons. The most organised group campaigning against the ordination of women was Women Against the Ordination of Women.

The St. Hilda Community, in turn, was formed in response to the failure to pass Women Lawfully Ordained Abroad Measure, which would have enabled women ordained abroad to celebrate the Eucharist, in the same way that men ordained abroad were able to.

In 1994, the Movement for the Ordination for Women was wound up after the 1993 measure was passed.

To campaign for the ordination of women as bishops, Women and the Church (WATCH) was founded in 1996. As of 2026, WATCH continues to campaign for the ordination of women on an equal basis to men, and against the protections for clergy who object to the ordination of women.

== Deacons ==
=== Deacons (Ordination of Women) Measure 1986 ===
Deacons (Ordination of Women) Measure 1986
- Measure of the Church of England
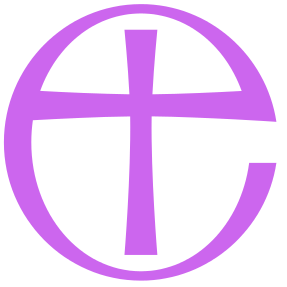
- General Synod of the Church of England
- Long title: A Measure passed by the General Synod of the Church of England to make provision as to the relief of hardship incurred by persons resigning from ecclesiastical service by reason of opposition to the ordination of women as priests, and for connected purposes.
- Citation: 1986 No. 4

Dates
- Royal assent: 7 November 1986

Status: Repealed

Text of statute as originally enacted

Revised text of statute as amended

Text of the Deacons (Ordination of Women) Measure 1986 as in force today (including any amendments) within the United Kingdom, from legislation.gov.uk.

The Deacons (Ordination of Women) Measure 1986 was passed by the General Synod to enable women to be able to be ordained as deacons. The measure came into effect on 16 February 1987.

In 1987, the first 71 female deacons were ordained under the measure in a ceremony in St. Paul's Cathedral. The first female deacons included Vivienne Faull, who went on to become a bishop, and Yvonne Clarke, the first black women to be a deacon.

== Priests ==
=== Priests (Ordination of Women) Measure 1993 ===
Priests (Ordination of Women) Measure 1993
- Measure of the Church of England
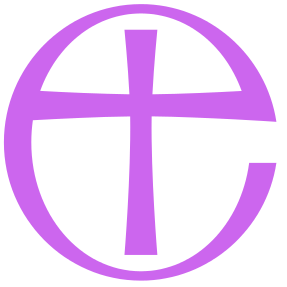
- General Synod of the Church of England
- Long title: A Measure passed by the General Synod of the Church of England to make provision for the ordination of women as priests, and for connected purposes.
- Citation: 1993 No. 2

Dates
- Royal assent: 5 November 1993

Status: Repealed

Text of statute as originally enacted

Revised text of statute as amended

Text of the Priests (Ordination of Women) Measure 1993 as in force today (including any amendments) within the United Kingdom, from legislation.gov.uk.

The Priests (Ordination of Women) Measure 1993 was passed by the General Synod to enable women to be ordained as priests.

On 12 March 1994, the first 32 female priests were appointed under the measure at a ceremony in Bristol Cathedral. Until 2022, the plaque commemorating the occasion only mentioned the male clergy who carried out the ceremony, but this was replaced in 2022 with a plaque to name the women ordained.

To allow those who refused to accept the presence of a female priest to be protected, two resolutions were provided by the measure.

Resolution A

"That this parochial church council would not accept a woman as the minister who presides at or celebrates the Holy Communion or pronounces the Absolution in the parish."

Resolution B

"That this parochial church council would not accept a woman as the incumbent or priest-in-charge of the benefice or as a team vicar for the benefice."

The passage of the measure required both Queen's Consent and Prince's Consent.

=== Episcopal Ministry Act of Synod 1993 ===
In addition to the resolutions provided in the measure itself, the Episcopal Ministry Act of Synod 1993 provided for an additional resolution, which has become known as "Resolution C".

Until February 2020, the Episcopal Ministry Act of Synod 1993 had been the only Act of Synod that had ever been passed by the General Synod.

The Act of Synod provided for provincial episcopal visitors.

=== Ordination of Women (Financial Provisions) Measure 1993 ===
Ordination of Women (Financial Provisions) Measure 1993
- Measure of the Church of England
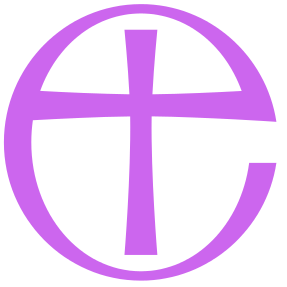
- General Synod of the Church of England
- Long title: A Measure passed by the General Synod of the Church of England to make provision as to the relief of hardship incurred by persons resigning from ecclesiastical service by reason of opposition to the ordination of women as priests, and for connected purposes.
- Citation: 1993 No. 3

Dates
- Royal assent: 5 November 1993

Status: Repealed

Text of statute as originally enacted

Revised text of statute as amended

Text of the Ordination of Women (Financial Provisions) Measure 1993 as in force today (including any amendments) within the United Kingdom, from legislation.gov.uk.

Alongside the main measure, the Ordination of Women (Financial Provisions) Measure 1993 by the provided for compensation arrangements for individuals who felt obliged to leave the Church of England once its priests were ordained.

The Church Commissioners for England are paying agents under the legislation.

The measure contained an appeal mechanism.

=== Depiction in The Vicar of Dibley ===
The Vicar of Dibley depicted the life in the Church of England following the decision to allow the ordination of women as priests.

=== Legal challenge ===
Paul Williamson unsuccessfully legally challenged the Priests (Ordination of Women) Measure 1993.

== Bishops ==
=== General Synod procedural history ===
In 2005, 2008, and 2010, the General Synod voted to remove obstacles preventing women from becoming bishops, but this did not immediately remove the legal obstacles themselves.

In 2012, a measure was proposed concerning the ordination of women as bishops as priests but it failed because several members of the Synod felt that it made adequate provision for theological differences.

=== Bishops and Priests (Consecration and Ordination of Women) Measure 2014 ===
Bishops and Priests (Consecration and Ordination of Women) Measure 2014
- Measure of the Church of England
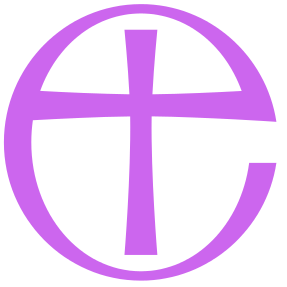
- General Synod of the Church of England
- Long title: A Measure passed by the General Synod of the Church of England to make provision for the consecration of women as bishops and for the continuation of provision for the ordination of women as priests; to repeal the Priests (Ordination of Women) Measure 1993; and for connected purposes.
- Citation: 2014 No. 2

Dates
- Royal assent: 23 October 2014

Status: Repealed

Text of statute as originally enacted

Revised text of statute as amended

Text of the Deacons (Ordination of Women) Measure 1986 as in force today (including any amendments) within the United Kingdom, from legislation.gov.uk.

The Bishops and Priests (Consecration and Ordination of Women) Measure 2014 was passed by the General Synod in 2014 to enable women to able to be ordained as bishops.

On 26 January 2015, Libby Lane was appointed the first female bishop was appointed under the measure. Lane had a consecration ceremony in York Minster.

The 2014 measure rescinded the 1993 Act of Synod.

=== House of Bishop’s Declaration ===
The House of Bishops’ Declaration on the Ministry of Bishops and Priests (known as the House of Bishop’s Declaration) which contained the "Five Guiding Principles", was passed in addition to the 2014 measure to provide for protections for individuals who refused to accept the presence of a female bishop, in a similar way to the 1993 Act of Synod.

While formally rescinding the Act of Synod, resolution C, as well as resolution A and resolution B under the main 1993 measure, became possible resolutions. Individual parishes can pass their own resolutions under the 2014 declaration.

=== Legal challenge ===
Paul Williamson unsuccessfully legally challenged the Bishops and Priests (Consecration and Ordination of Women) Measure 2014.

=== Archbishops ===
In 2026, Dame Sarah Mullally was confirmed as the first female Archbishop of Canterbury. She is the first bishop who is unable to preside over communion in hundreds of parishes due to the 2014 declaration.

As of 2026, there has not been a female Archbishop of York.

== Isle of Man ==
The Synod of the Diocese of Sodor and Man passed the Church (Miscellaneous Provisions) Measure (Isle of Man) 1990, which included provisions allowing the ordination of women as deacons by extending the 1986 measure to the Isle of Man. This was commenced in April 1991. In 1994, Susan Mary Watterson was the first woman to be ordained as a priest under the measure. Watterson was ordained in a ceremony at St George's Church in Douglas.

In 2013, the Diocese of Sodor and Man was the only Church of England diocese without any female priests.

In 2015, the Synod of the Diocese of Sodor and Man passed the Bishops and Priests (Consecration and Ordination of Women) Measure (Isle of Man) 2015, extending the 2014 measure to the Isle of Man.

Despite coming from a traditionalist Anglo-Catholic background, Peter Eagles announced that he would "will ordain all who are called to be deacons and priests" after he became the Bishop of Sodor and Man.

In 2024, Tricia Hillas was appointed the first female Bishop of Sodor and Man. Hillas had an enthronement ceremony in Peel Cathedral.

== Channel Islands ==
In 1999, the Women Priests (Channel Islands) Order 1999 extended both of the 1993 measures to the Channel Islands.

== Other developments ==
=== Lords Spiritual ===
==== Lords Spiritual (Women) Act 2015 ====
The Lords Spiritual (Women) Act 2015 was passed to enable more women to become Lords Spiritual.

The 2015 act was extended from 2025 to 2030 by the Lords Spiritual (Women) Act 2015 (Extension) Act 2025.
