= Tom Dolphin =

British anaesthetist

Thomas Dolphin (born 1978 or 1979) is a British consultant anaesthetist who has served as Chair of the Council of the British Medical Association (BMA) since June 2025.

== Early life ==
Dolphin was raised in Essex, his father worked as a paramedic and his mother was a teacher. He works as part of a trauma surgery team at St Mary's Hospital, London.

== Career ==
From 2010 to 2012, Dolphin served as chairman of the BMA's junior doctors committee during which he supported the 2012 doctors' strike over pension reforms. He joined the Labour Party in 2012 and served as Dawn Butler's election agent during the 2017, 2019 and 2024 United Kingdom general elections. He also served as chair of Brent Central's constituency Labour Party and stood as a candidate in the 2024 election but was not shortlisted. In July 2024, he tabled a motion that led to the BMA rejecting the Cass Review's findings against the provision of puberty blockers to children.

== Personal life ==
He lives in London with his husband.
