= Claire Wand Fund =

Charitable fund administered by the British Medical Association

The Claire Wand Fund is a charitable fund administered by the British Medical Association (BMA). The fund offers grants to fund the further education of medical practitioners predominantly engaged in general practice and for the provision of scholarships (including travelling scholarships) for such practitioners.

== History ==
The fund was set up by Dr Solomon Wand and Dr Derek Stevenson in 1953. They named the fund after Dr Wand's late wife, Claire.

When general practitioners (GPs) agreed to work within the National Health Service (NHS), in 1948, they did so because of a promise made by Government that the recommendations of the SPENS Committee on GP remuneration would be implemented. This did not happen, so negotiations were carried out with the Government, by the Chairman of the General Medical Services Committee, Dr Solomon Wand, and the Committee's Secretary, Dr Derek Stevenson.

After disagreement with the Ministry of Health and the Minister of Health, Aneurin Bevan, the Government accepted that the issue would be adjudicated by a High Court judge (Mr. Justice Danckwerts) who judged decisively in the GPs' favour. The judgement was made in 1952 and has become known as the Danckwerts award.

As recognition of the outstanding services rendered to the medical profession by Dr Wand and Dr Stevenson, a collection was made for their personal benefit. This collection produced a sum of £10,800 which they used to establish a Trust Fund. This Trust Fund was to have as its purpose the further education of GPs and the provision of scholarships (including travelling scholarships) for such practitioners.
