= Harold Atcherley =

British businessman, public figure and arts administrator (1918-2017)

Sir Harold Atcherley
- Born: Harold Winter Atcherley; 30 August 1918 [Epsom England
- Died: 29 January 2017 (aged 98); London, England
- Education: Gresham's School; Geneva University; Heidelberg University
- Occupations: Businessman, public figure, arts administrator
- Spouses: Anita Helen Leslie (m. 1946; div. 1990) Elke Jessett (m. 1990; died 2004) Sarah Mordant (m. 2005)
- Children: 4
- Parents: L. W. Atcherley (father); Maude Lester Nash (mother)
- Military career
- Branch: British Army
- Units: Queen's Westminster Rifles (1939–1940); Intelligence Corps (1940); 18th Infantry Division
- Conflicts: World War II

Sir Harold Winter Atcherley (30 August 1918 – 29 January 2017) was a businessman, public figure and arts administrator in the United Kingdom.

== Early life ==
The son of L. W. Atcherley and his wife Maude Lester Nash, Atcherley was educated at Gresham's School, Holt, Geneva University, and Heidelberg University.

== Career ==
Atcherley joined Royal Dutch Shell in 1937. From 1939, he served through the Second World War in the Queen's Westminster Rifles (1939–1940) and the Intelligence Corps, 1940, then in the 18th Infantry Division in Singapore. After the fall of Singapore in 1942 he became a prisoner of war of the Japanese and worked on the Burma Railway until the war ended in 1945, then in 1946 he returned to Royal Dutch Shell. With that company he served in Egypt, Lebanon, Syria, Argentina, and Brazil until 1959 and was the RDS Group's Personnel co-ordinator from 1964 until 1970.

He was Recruitment Advisor to the Ministry of Defence, 1970–1971, and Chairman of Tyzack & Partners, 1979–1985. He was also a director of British Home Stores, 1973–1987. He lived in the village of Long Melford in Suffolk. In retirement, as of 2008 he lived in London. Atcherley died on 29 January 2017, aged 98.

== Appointments ==
- Chairman, Armed Forces' Pay Review Body (1971–1982)
- Chairman, Police Negotiating Board (1983–1986)
- Member, Top Salaries Review Body, 1971–1987
- Chairman, Aldeburgh Festival, 1989–1994
- Chairman, Toynbee Hall, 1985–1990 (Member of Management Committee, 1979–1990)
- Member, National Staff Committee for Nurses and Midwives, 1973–1977
- Member, Committee, Halsbury Report into the Pay and Related Conditions of Service of Nurses and Midwives 1974
- Member, Committee of Inquiry into Remuneration of Members of Local Authorities, 1977
- Vice-Chairman, Suffolk Wildlife Trust, 1987–1990
- Member of Management Committee, Suffolk Rural Housing Association, 1984–1987
- Chairman, Suffolk and North Essex Branch, European Movement, 1995–1998, and President since 1998

== Honours ==
- Empress Leopoldina Medal (Brazil), 1958
- Knighthood, 1977 Silver Jubilee and Birthday Honours

== Family ==
Atcherley married first, in 1946, Anita Helen Leslie. They had one son and two daughters and divorced in 1990. He married secondly, in 1990, Elke Jessett, the daughter of Carl Langbehn (she died in 2004). He married thirdly, in 2005, Sarah Mordant.

== Publications ==
- War Diary: Singapore, Siam & Burma, 1941-1945, illustrated by Ronald Searle (London, Harold Atcherley, 2004)
- Euro paean: In 1998, Atcherley wrote in The Independent in support of Britain joining the European single currency.
- In the aftermath of the 9/11 attack on the World Trade Center, Atcherley, writing in The Independent, ascribed the fundamental causes of the disaster to the non-observation by the British government of the Balfour Declaration. He wrote to The Times on 3 August 2006: "How can the Israelis, Bush and Blair think they can ever achieve lasting peace in the Middle East by allowing Israel to continue its futile attempt to 'defeat' Hezbollah? ...Unless military action is replaced by negotiation, I can only see disastrous consequences for our relations with the Muslim world."
- On 6 September 2001, a letter from Atcherley was published in London's The Independent newspaper, headed Reports of my death... and enquiring why for two years running the newspaper had failed to include his name in its Today's Birthdays column. He suggested:

It occurs to me that it may be because I am dead without being aware of it. This is perhaps too fanciful, if only because, as far as I am aware, my name has not yet appeared in your Deaths section... My own hunch is that my supreme unimportance may have something to do with it.

His birthday, however, has continued to be reported in The Times.
