= Ten Minute Rule =

Procedure in UK House of Commons

The Ten Minute Rule, also known as Standing Order No. 23, is a procedure in the House of Commons of the United Kingdom for the introduction of private member's bills in addition to the 20 per session normally permissible. It is one of the ways in which a bill may receive its first reading.

== Introduction of the bill ==
Any Member of Parliament (MP) may introduce a bill under the Ten Minute Rule, although in practice it is only used by backbenchers. To qualify to introduce a bill under the rule, the MP in question must be the first through the door to the Public Bill Office on the Tuesday or Wednesday morning fifteen working days (usually three weeks) prior to the date they wish to introduce their bill. Due to the popularity of the rule and the difficulty in launching a private member's bill by other means, MPs have been known to sleep outside the Public Bill Office in order to guarantee a slot. In 2014 three MPs agreed a sleeping rota between themselves to ensure that they were first in the queue.

== Debate ==
Ten Minute Rule motions are held in the main chamber of the House of Commons immediately after question time, around 12:45pm on most Tuesdays and Wednesdays. Whichever MP has reserved the slot presents their bill and is entitled to speak for 10 minutes to convince the house of its merit. After the 10 minutes have passed, another MP may speak for a further 10 minutes to oppose the bill. The Speaker then calls a voice vote to decide whether the bill should be allowed a second reading, to debate the bill at a later date. The Speaker will divide the house for a recorded count of votes if there is some opposition. However, the majority of Ten Minute Rule motions are not objected to, and are allowed to proceed without any debate at this stage; this is because MPs have not yet been able to review the bill's content.

== Progression towards becoming law ==
When a Ten Minute Rule motion passes, the bill is added to the register of parliamentary business. It is scheduled for debate along with the other private member's bills, but at a lower priority. The Backbench Business Committee (or Leader of the House of Commons, if the government decides to support the bill) are responsible for determining if and when to allocate parliamentary time for a second reading debate; the MP presenting the bill must then inform the Speaker of its date. The bill is generally printed and published shortly before the second reading.

Bills introduced under the Ten Minute Rule rarely progress much further, because the government usually opposes private member's bills at the second reading and any later stages. Given their low priority in the schedule, there is often insufficient time for the legislative process to complete before the end of the parliamentary session. Most Ten Minute Rule introductions are instead used to stimulate publicity for a cause, especially because the debate follows the media-popular question time and is usually broadcast live on BBC Parliament. Alternatively, a Ten Minute Rule bill can be used to gauge the opinion of MPs on an issue which is planned to be introduced in another bill at a later date.

Sometimes bills introduced under the Ten Minute Rule do become law, passing through every stage of legislation including royal assent. Between 1945 and 2010, there were more than sixty acts of Parliament which were initially introduced under the Ten Minute Rule, including the Divorce (Religious Marriages) Act 2002. As of 2024, the most recent example is the Holocaust (Return of Cultural Objects) (Amendment) Act 2019.

The Military Action Against Iraq (Parliamentary Approval) Bill was introduced under the Ten Minute Rule in 1999, but was denied Queen's Consent (by Elizabeth II) for its progression to a second reading. This vetoing of the bill by the monarch was on the advice of government ministers; it was later criticised in the media.
