= Powers of the fire service in the United Kingdom =

The powers of the fire service in the United Kingdom are extensive, but vary between jurisdictions. These powers generally only apply to members of public fire and rescue services. Powers are granted to firefighters in England & Wales by virtue of the Fire and Rescue Services Act 2004, in Scotland by virtue of the Fire (Scotland) Act 2005 and in Northern Ireland by virtue of the Fire and Rescue Services (Northern Ireland) Order 2006. Whilst the three acts are almost identical in effect, they word the powers differently and vary in relation to the issuance of warrants.

== England and Wales ==
=== In emergencies ===
A fire and rescue authority may authorise in writing an employee for the purposes of section 44 of the Fire and Rescue Services Act 2004 (separate from authorisation under section 45 below, which is only granted to some firefighters).

They may do anything they reasonably believe to be necessary for the purpose of:

- extinguishing or preventing the fire or protecting life or property (if they reasonably believe a fire to have broken out or to be about to break out),
- rescuing people or protecting them from serious harm (if they reasonably believe a road traffic accident to have occurred),
- discharging any function conferred on the fire and rescue authority in relation to the emergency (if they reasonably believe an emergency of another kind to have occurred), or
- preventing or limiting damage to property resulting from action taken as mentioned above.

An "emergency" means an event or situation that causes or is likely to cause:

- one or more individuals to die, be seriously injured or become seriously ill, or
- serious harm to the environment (including the life and health of plants and animals).

They may also:

- enter premises or a place, by force if necessary, without the consent of the owner or occupier of the premises or place,
- move or break into a vehicle without the consent of its owner,
- close a highway,
- stop and regulate traffic, or
- restrict the access of persons to premises or a place.

A person who without reasonable excuse obstructs or hinders a person employed by a fire and rescue authority while responding to "emergency circumstances" commits an offence. The maximum punishment is a fine not exceeding level five on the standard scale.

"Emergency circumstances" are those that are present or imminent and:

- are causing or are likely to cause:
  - serious injury to or the serious illness (including mental illness) of a person,
  - serious harm to the environment (including the life and health of plants and animals),
  - serious harm to any building or other property, or
  - a worsening of any such injury, illness or harm, or
- are likely to cause the death of a person.

=== Investigations and execution of functions ===
A fire and rescue authority may authorise in writing an employee for the purposes of section 45 of the Fire and Rescue Services Act 2004 (separate from authorisation under section 44 above, which is granted to all firefighters).

An authorised officer may at any reasonable time enter premises:

- for the purpose of obtaining information needed for the discharge of a fire and rescue authority’s functions under section 7, section 8 or section 9, or
- if there has been a fire in the premises, for the purpose of investigating what caused the fire or why it progressed as it did.

However, an authorised officer may not:

- enter premises by force, or
- demand admission as of right to premises occupied as a private dwelling unless 24 hours' notice in writing has first been given to the occupier of the dwelling.

An authorised officer may not enter as of right premises in which there has been a fire if the premises are unoccupied, and the premises were occupied as a private dwelling immediately before the fire, unless 24 hours' notice in writing has first been given to the person who was the occupier of the dwelling immediately before the fire.

An authorised officer may apply to a justice of the peace if he considers it necessary to enter premises, but he is unable to do so, or considers that he is likely to be unable to do so, otherwise than by force. If on an application a justice is satisfied that it is necessary for the officer to enter the premises, and he is unable to do so, or is likely to be unable to do so, otherwise than by force, he may issue a warrant authorising the officer to enter the premises by force at any reasonable time.

An authorised officer may also apply to a justice of the peace if he considers it necessary to enter a dwelling without giving notice as required. If on an application a justice is satisfied that it is necessary for the authorised officer to enter the dwelling without giving notice as required, the justice may issue a warrant authorising the officer to enter the premises at any time (by force if necessary).

An authorised officer exercising a power of entry under this section must, if so required, produce evidence of his authorisation, and any warrant, before entering the premises, or at any time before leaving the premises.

If an authorised officer exercises a power of entry for the purposes of obtaining information needed for the discharge of a fire and rescue authority’s functions under section 7, 8 or 9, he may take with him any other persons, and any equipment, that he considers necessary, and require any person present on the premises to provide him with any facilities, information, documents or records, or other assistance, that he may reasonably request.

If an authorised officer exercises a power of entry for the purpose of investigating what caused a fire or why it progressed as it did, he may:

- take with him any other persons, and any equipment, that he considers necessary,
- inspect and copy any documents or records on the premises or remove them from the premises,
- carry out any inspections, measurements and tests in relation to the premises, or to an article or substance found on the premises, that he considers necessary,
- take samples of an article or substance found on the premises, but not so as to destroy it or damage it unless it is necessary to do so for the purpose of the investigation,
- dismantle an article found on the premises, but not so as to destroy it or damage it unless it is necessary to do so for the purpose of the investigation,
- take possession of an article or substance found on the premises and detain it for as long as is necessary for any of these purposes:
  - to examine it and do anything he has power to do under paragraph (c) or (e),
  - to ensure that it is not tampered with before his examination of it is completed,
  - to ensure that it is available for use as evidence in proceedings for an offence relevant to the investigation,
- require a person present on the premises to provide him with any facilities, information, documents or records, or other assistance, that he may reasonably request.

If an authorised officer takes samples of an article or substance found on the premises he must leave a notice at the premises (either with a responsible person or if that is impracticable fixed in a prominent position) giving particulars of the article or substance and stating that he has taken a sample of it, and if it is practicable to do so, give to a responsible person at the premises a portion of the sample marked in a manner sufficient to identify it.

If an authorised officer takes possession of an article or substance found on the premises, he must leave a notice at the premises (either with a responsible person or if that is impracticable fixed in a prominent position) giving particulars of the article or substance and stating that he has taken possession of it.

If in the exercise of any power an authorised officer enters premises which are unoccupied, or from which the occupier is temporarily absent, he must on his departure leave the premises as effectively secured against unauthorised entry as he found them.

A person commits an offence if without reasonable excuse:

- he obstructs the exercise of any power, or
- he fails to comply with any requirement, being a person present on the premises, to provide an authorised officer with any facilities, information, documents or records, or other assistance, that he may reasonably request.

The maximum punishment is a fine not exceeding level 3 on the standard scale.

==== Enforcement of fire safety legislation ====
In England and Wales Fire Safety Inspectors are given additional powers to firefighters in order to carry out routine inspections, investigate the commission of fire safety related offences and prohibit or restrict the use of un-safe buildings. They also issue other legal notices. Their powers are derived not only from the Fire Rescue Services Act 2004 but also Article 27 of the Regulatory Reform (Fire Safety) Order 2005, the Health & Safety at Work Act etc 1974, Fireworks Act 2003, and the Licensing Act 2003 including other pieces of legislation. Upon the granting of a warrant from a Magistrate, Fire Inspectors may use force to make entry into a premises for the purposes of securing evidence, investigating the commission of an offence or to make an inspection. Usually this is done with the Police in attendance. Any persons suspected of committing an offence are ordinarily placed under caution and invited for an interview under PACE conditions. Committing a fire safety-related offence includes summary and indictable offences which means for more serious cases the offenders could be sent to prison.

== Scotland ==
=== In emergencies ===
An employee of a fire and rescue authority who is authorised in writing by the authority for the purposes of Section 25 of the Fire (Scotland) Act 2005 and on duty may:

- if the employee reasonably believes that a fire has broken out, do anything the employee reasonably believes to be necessary for the purpose of—
  - extinguishing the fire; or
  - protecting life or property;
- if the employee reasonably believes that a road traffic accident has occurred, do anything the employee reasonably believes to be necessary for the purpose of—
  - rescuing people; or
  - protecting them from serious harm;
- if the employee reasonably believes that an emergency other than a fire or road traffic accident has occurred, do anything the employee reasonably believes to be necessary for the purpose of carrying out any function conferred on the authority in relation to the emergency; and
- do anything the employee reasonably believes to be necessary for the purpose of preventing or limiting damage to property resulting from action taken as mentioned above.

An authorised employee may in particular:

- enter premises or a place (by force if necessary);
- move a vehicle without the consent of its owner;
- force open and enter a lockfast vehicle;
- close a road;
- stop and regulate traffic;
- restrict the access of persons to premises or a place.

=== Carrying out of functions ===
An employee of a fire and rescue authority who is authorised in writing by the authority for the purposes of section 28 may at any reasonable time enter premises for the purpose of obtaining information needed for the carrying out of the authority’s functions under section 9, section 10 or section 11 of the Fire (Scotland) Act 2005.

An authorised employee may not:

- enter premises by force; or
- demand admission to premises occupied as a private dwelling unless 24 hours' notice in writing has first been given to the occupier of the dwelling.

If, on the application of an authorised employee, a sheriff or justice of the peace is satisfied that:

- it is necessary for the employee to enter premises, and
- the employee is unable to do so, or is likely to be unable to do so, otherwise than by force,

the sheriff or justice may issue a warrant authorising the employee to enter the premises by force at any reasonable time. If a sheriff or justice of the peace is satisfied that

- it is necessary for the employee to enter premises without giving notice

the sheriff or justice may issue a warrant authorising the employee to enter the premises at any time (by force if necessary).

If an authorised employee exercises a power of entry by virtue of this section, the employee may take onto the premises such other persons and such equipment as the employee considers necessary, and require any person present on the premises to provide the employee with any facilities, information, documents or records, or other assistance that the employee may reasonably request.

Before entering the premises, or at any time before leaving the premises, an authorised employee exercising a power of entry shall, if so required, produce evidence of the employee’s authorisation for the purpose of this section, and any warrant.

=== Investigations into fires ===
An employee of a fire and rescue authority who is authorised in writing by the authority for the purposes of section 29 [as explained above] may, at any reasonable time (by force if necessary), enter premises in which there has been a fire for the purpose of investigating what caused the fire, or why it progressed as it did.

If an authorised employee exercises the power above the employee may:

- take onto the premises such other persons, and such equipment as the employee considers necessary,
- inspect and copy any documents or records on the premises or remove them from the premises,
- carry out any inspections, measurements and tests in relation to the premises, or an article or substance found on the premises,

that the employee considers necessary;

- take samples of an article or substance found on the premises (but not so as to destroy it or damage it unless it is necessary to do so for the purpose of the investigation),
- dismantle an article found on the premises (but not so as to destroy it or damage it unless it is necessary to do so for the purpose of the investigation),
- take possession of an article or substance found on the premises and retain it for as long as is necessary for the purpose of:
  - examining it and doing anything the employee has power to do under the paragraphs above,
  - ensuring that it is not tampered with before the employee’s examination of it is completed, or
  - ensuring that it is available for use as evidence in proceedings for an offence relevant to the investigation,
- require a person present on the premises to provide the employee with any facilities, information, documents or records, or other assistance that the employee may reasonably request.

An authorised employee exercising the power of entry shall, if so required, produce evidence of the employee’s authorisation for the purpose of this section before entering the premises, or at any time before leaving the premises.

If an authorised employee exercises the power to take samples the employee shall:

- leave a notice at the premises with a responsible person (or, if that is impracticable, fixed in a prominent position) giving particulars of the article or substance and stating that the employee has taken a sample of it, and
- if it is practicable to do so, give such a person at the premises a portion of the sample marked in a manner sufficient to identify it.

If an authorised employee exercises the power to take possession of an article or substance the employee shall leave a notice at the premises (either with a responsible person or if that is impracticable fixed in a prominent position) giving particulars of the article or substance and stating that the employee has taken possession of it.

This section applies in relation to vehicles as it applies in relation to premises, and:

- gives the power to enter premises in which a vehicle in which there has been a fire is being kept,
- gives the power to take persons and equipment to the place where a vehicle is, and
- references to premises include references to premises in which vehicles are kept.

In this section “premises” includes land.

== Northern Ireland ==
Any person who assaults, resists, obstructs or impedes a fire and rescue officer in the execution of his duty, or a person assisting a fire and rescue officer in the execution of his duty, commits an offence. The maximum punishment is:

- on summary conviction, to imprisonment for a term not exceeding 6 months and/or a fine not exceeding the statutory maximum, or
- on conviction on indictment, to imprisonment for a term not exceeding 2 years and/or a fine.

If a person falsely pretends to be a fire and rescue officer or an authorised officer he shall be guilty of an offence and shall be liable on summary conviction to a fine not exceeding level 3 on the standard scale.

=== In emergencies ===
An on-duty fire officer may do anything they reasonably believe to be necessary for the purpose of:

- extinguishing or preventing the fire or protecting life or property (if they reasonably believe a fire to have broken out or to be about to break out),
- rescuing people or protecting them from serious harm if they reasonably believe a road traffic accident to have occurred,
- discharging any function conferred on the fire and rescue authority in relation to the emergency (if they reasonably believe an emergency of another kind to have occurred), or
- preventing or limiting damage to property resulting from action taken as mentioned above.

In particular, a fire and rescue officer may:

- enter premises or a place, by force if necessary, without the consent of the owner or occupier of the premises or place,
- move or break into a vehicle without the consent of its owner,
- close a highway,
- stop and regulate traffic, or
- restrict the access of persons to premises or a place.

An "emergency" means an event or situation that causes or is likely to cause:

- one or more individuals to die, be seriously injured or become seriously ill, or
- serious harm to the environment (including the life and health of plants and animals).

=== Carrying out of functions ===
A fire and rescue officer who is authorised in writing by the Chief Fire and Rescue Officer for the purposes of Articles 19 and 20 of the Fire and Rescue Services (Northern Ireland) Order 2006 is an "authorised officer". They may at any reasonable time enter premises for the purpose of obtaining information needed for the carrying out of the Board's functions under Article 5, Article 6 or Article 7. However, an authorised officer may not:

- enter premises by force; or
- demand admission to premises occupied as a private dwelling unless 24 hours' notice in writing has first been given to the occupier of the dwelling.

If, on the application of an authorised officer, a lay magistrate is satisfied that:

- it is necessary for the officer to enter premises, and
- the officer is unable to do so, or is likely to be unable to do so, otherwise than by force,

he may issue a warrant authorising the officer to enter the premises by force at any reasonable time.

If, on the application of an authorised officer, a lay magistrate is satisfied that:

- it is necessary for the officer to enter premises without giving notice as required,

he may issue a warrant authorising the officer to enter the premises at any time (by force if necessary).

If an authorised officer exercises these powers of entry, he may take onto the premises any other persons, and any equipment, that he considers necessary, and require a person present on the premises to provide him with any facilities, information, documents or records, or other assistance, that he may reasonably request.

An authorised officer exercising these powers of entry shall, if so required, produce evidence of his authorisation under paragraph and any warrant before entering the premises or at any time before leaving the premises. An authorised officer, exercising these powers of entry, who enters premises which are unoccupied, or from which the occupier is temporarily absent, shall on departure ensure that all reasonable measures have been taken to leave the premises as effectively secured against unauthorised entry as he found them.

=== Investigations into fires ===
An authorised officer may, at any reasonable time (by force if necessary), enter premises in which there has been a fire for the purpose of investigating what caused the fire; or why it progressed as it did.

If an authorised officer exercises this power of entry, he may:

- take onto the premises any other persons, and any equipment, that he considers necessary,
- inspect and copy any documents or records on the premises or remove them from the premises,
- carry out any inspections, measurements and tests in relation to the premises or an article or substance found on the premises, that he considers necessary,
- take samples of an article or substance found on the premises (but not so as to destroy it or damage it unless it is necessary to do so for the purpose of the investigation),
- dismantle an article found on the premises (but not so as to destroy it or damage it unless it is necessary to do so for the purpose of the investigation),
- take possession of an article or substance found on the premises and retain it for as long as is necessary for the purpose of:
  - examining it and doing anything he has power to do under the paragraphs above,
  - ensuring that it is not tampered with before his examination of it is completed, or
  - ensuring that it is available for use as evidence in proceedings for an offence relevant to the investigation, and
- require a person present on the premises to provide him with any facilities, information, documents or records, or other assistance, that he may reasonably request.

An authorised officer exercising a power of entry by virtue of this Article shall, if so required, produce evidence of his authorisation before entering the premises; or at any time before leaving the premises.

If an authorised officer exercises the power to take samples, he shall:

- leave a notice at the premises with a responsible person (or, if that is impracticable, fix the notice in a prominent position at the premises) giving particulars of the article or substance and stating that he has taken a sample of it, and
- if it is practicable to do so, give to a responsible person at the premises a portion of the sample marked in a manner sufficient to identify it.

If an authorised officer exercises the power to take possession of an article or substance, he shall leave a notice at the premises with a responsible person (or, if that is impracticable, fix the notice in a prominent position at the premises) giving particulars of the article or substance and stating that he has taken possession of it. An authorised officer, exercising these powers of entry, who enters premises which are unoccupied, or from which the occupier is temporarily absent, shall on departure ensure that all reasonable measures have been taken to leave the premises as effectively secured against unauthorised entry as he found them.

== See also ==
- Law enforcement in the United Kingdom
