= Review Body on Doctors' and Dentists' Remuneration =

- Formation: 1960
- Type: Non-departmental public body
- Website: www.gov.uk/government/organisations/review-body-on-doctors-and-dentists-remuneration

The Review Body on Doctors' and Dentists' Remuneration, also known as the Doctors' and Dentists' Review Body (DDRB), is a body established to set the pay of doctors and dentists in the National Health Service.

The Review Body invites evidence from a range of stakeholders, including the British Medical Association and the Government, and then provides a recommendation to the Government on how much doctors' pay should increase in the following year. This recommendation is then taken under advisement and the Government then sets the pay rises through the NHS Employers organisation. The pay rises are published with the implementation schedules, in the NHS Medical and Dental Pay Circular (Available from the NHS Employers website and published every year on 1 April).

In principle the DDRB matches doctors' pay with others doing similar jobs in the public and private sector, and ensures that doctors' pay continues to match that of others doing comparable jobs, and on comparable incomes. In practice it has been suggested that the DDRB has failed to maintain doctors' incomes in line with others, partly because of pressure from HM Treasury, and partly because the Government has refused to meet fully the DDRB recommendations. There is evidence that doctors' income has been falling over many years.

== History ==
The DDRB was constituted in 1960 after the full acceptance of the Royal Commission of Doctor's and Dentist's Remuneration by Parliament.

== Reform ==
As part of a pay deal to Consultant doctors in England to end consultant doctor strikes in England, which was announced to have been accepted on the 5th of April 2024, some reform of the DDRB had been offered.
