= Review Body =

UK government mechanism for collective bargaining

A Review Body in the United Kingdom is a government mechanism to replace collective bargaining for certain groups of employees in the public sector, for example doctors and nurses in the National Health Service. A Review Body makes independent recommendations on pay after considering evidence from the relevant parties (typically government, employers and unions), with cherished expectations that the Government will honour those recommendations and the unions will not pursue national industrial action.

== Office of Manpower Economics ==
The Office of Manpower Economics (OME) is a non-statutory body set up to provide an independent secretariat for each of the eight pay review bodies. It is funded by the Department for Business and Trade (DBT).

== Review bodies ==
The Review Body system started in 1960 for doctors and dentists after the publication of The Royal Commission on Doctor's and Dentist's Remuneration. As of 2005 there were six Review Bodies overseen by OME which together covered approximately 26% of the total 5.8 million employed in the UK public sector.

- Armed Forces' Pay Review Body (ARPRB; covering 188,000 personnel)
- Review Body on Doctors' and Dentists' Remuneration (DDRB; covering 168,000 personnel)
- Nursing and Other Health Professions Review Body (covering 668,000 full-time equivalent staff); now the NHS Pay Review Body (NHSPRB)
- Prison Service Pay Review Body (PSPRB; covering 33,000 full-time equivalent staff)
- School Teachers' Review Body (STRB; covering 468,000 full-time equivalent staff)
- Senior Salaries Review Body (SSRB; covering 6,000 personnel)

Additionally, the following bodies are now also overseen by the OME:

- Police Remuneration Review Body (PRRB)
- National Crime Agency Remuneration Review Body (NCARRB)

Each Review Body is established as a non-departmental public body (NDPB) that is sponsored by the relevant department of the UK Government (e.g. the Armed Forces Pay Review Body is sponsored by the Ministry of Defence). However, the review bodies do have their own secretariat provided by the Government in the OME.

The existence of a Review Body does not necessarily block the practice of collective bargaining, but its recommendations are required before a negotiated bargain is implemented. A major harmonisation of NHS pay structure, the Agenda for Change, was provisionally agreed in 2003 by unions representing nurses and other health professions in the NHS, unions representing NHS staff not covered by a Review Body (e.g. office staff), NHS employers and government before the Nursing and Other Health Professions Review Body considered the issue: it recommended in favour of implementing the negotiated agreement.
