= Military Action Against Iraq (Parliamentary Approval) Bill =

1999 bill proposed in the UK Parliament

- Bill
- Parliament of the United Kingdom
- Long title: A Bill to require the prior approval, by a simple majority of the House of Commons, of military action by United Kingdom forces against Iraq.

Status: Not passed

The Military Action Against Iraq (Parliamentary Approval) Bill was a private member's bill introduced into the House of Commons of the United Kingdom by Tam Dalyell under the Ten Minute Rule. It received its formal first reading on 26 January 1999. The bill sought to transfer the power to authorise military strikes against Iraq from the monarch to Parliament. The long title of the bill was "A Bill to require the prior approval, by a simple majority of the House of Commons, of military action by United Kingdom forces against Iraq". It was presented by Tam Dalyell and supported by Tony Benn, Harry Cohen, Jeremy Corbyn, George Galloway, Neil Gerrard, Ian Gibson, John McAllion, Alice Mahon, Robert Marshall-Andrews, Dennis Skinner, and Audrey Wise.

The bill became Bill 35 in the 1998/1999 parliamentary session, and was initially scheduled for second reading on 16 April 1999. As a bill modifying the monarch's prerogative powers, Queen's Consent was required before it could be debated in Parliament. The Queen refused to grant her consent for the bill to be debated. The second reading was initially postponed from 16 April until 23 July 1999. Due to the Crown's continuing refusal to signify its consent to the bill being debated, it could not receive its second reading on 23 July 1999. In the absence of a request for a further postponement, the bill was automatically dropped before it obtained its second reading.

When military action against Iraq was eventually organised in 2003, the government sought parliamentary approval on 18 March 2003, one day before the invasion began, although no powers under the royal prerogative were thereby transferred to Parliament.
