= Police Remuneration Review Body =

The Police Remuneration Review Body (PRRB) is a United Kingdom Review Body that makes independent recommendations on pay and terms and conditions of employment of the police in England and Wales to the Government. It is funded by the Home Office, and the Office of Manpower Economics provides the Board with an independent Secretariat. It replaced the Police Negotiating Board (PNB) on 1 October 2014, which remained active in Scotland.

Zoë Billingham CBE is the current Chair.

== Recommendations and Government response ==
The below table summarises the PRRB's recommendations and the Government response for each year. The response generally generally takes effect from 1 September in the same year of the review.

Report	Recommendation	Government response
1st (2015)	A 1% increase to all pay points, as well as London Weighting and Dog Handlers' Allowance.	Accepted.
1st (2015)	The London inspecting lead should be retained.	Accepted.
2nd (2016)	A 1% increase to all pay points, as well as London Weighting and Dog Handlers' Allowance.	Accepted.
2nd (2016)	The maxima for South East Allowances to be increased to £2,000 and £3,000 respectively.	Accepted.
2nd (2016)	Motor Vehicle Allowances mileage rates for federated and superintending ranks should be the prevailing HMRC rates for essential and casual users. The current structure and values for the essential users’ lump sums should remain.	Accepted.
3rd (2017)	A 2% increase to all pay points, as well as London Weighting and Dog Handlers' Allowance.	Increased by 1%, but provided a 1% non-consolidated pay award for 2017/18 only.
3rd (2017)	The introduction of appropriate, targeted arrangements in 2017/18 to allow local flexibility for chief officers to make additional payments to police officers in hard-to-fill roles and in superintending ranks until September 2020.	The Home Secretary welcomed this recommendation.
3rd (2017)	The Home Office, National Police Chiefs' Council (NPCC) and College of Policing (CoP) should publish an integrated police workforce and pay reform plan through to 2020.	The Home Secretary looked to the CoP and the NPCC to take forward this work.
4th (2018)	The 1% non-consolidated pay award from 2017/18 should be consolidated onto all pay.	Rejected.
4th (2018)	A 2% increase to all pay points, as well as London Weighting and Dog Handlers' Allowance.	Accepted.
4th (2018)	Police forces to appoint apprentice constables on a starting salary of between £18,000 and pay point 1.	Accepted.
4th (2018)	Following twelve months, and subject to satisfactory completion of Year 1 of their apprenticeship, apprentice constables to move to the next pay point on the existing police constable pay scale.	Accepted.
5th (2019)	A one-year pay award for all police officers in 2019/20.	Accepted.
5th (2019)	A 2.5% increase to all pay points, as well as London Weighting and Dog Handlers' Allowance.	Accepted.
5th (2019)	No change to apprentice progression, namely that following twelve months, and subject to satisfactory completion of Year 1 of their apprenticeship, apprentice constables should move to the next pay point on the existing police constable pay scale.	Accepted.
5th (2019)	An increase in the On-call Allowance from £15 to £20.	Accepted.
6th (2020)	A 2.5% increase to all pay points, as well as London Weighting and Dog Handlers' Allowance.	Accepted.
6th (2020)	The removal of the lowest point of the sergeants’ pay scale.	Accepted.
6th (2020)	The maximum rate of London Allowance should increase by £1,000 to £5,338 a year for officers appointed on or after 1 September 1994 and not receiving Replacement Allowance.	Accepted.
7th (2021)	The minimum rates for Police Constable Degree Apprentice starting pay and pay point 0 of the constable scale are uplifted by £250, and that all officers with a basic salary above these minima but below £24,000 (on a full‑time equivalent basis) should receive a consolidated pay award of £250.	Accepted.
8th (2022)	A one-year award for police officers in 2022/23.	Rejected.
8th (2022)	A consolidated increase of £1,900 to all police officer pay points for all ranks.	Accepted.
8th (2022)	The Police Constable Degree Apprentice (PCDA) minimum should be raised to pay point 0 (£23,556 from 1 September 2022).	Accepted.
8th (2022)	London Weighting and the Dog Handlers’ Allowance should be uplifted by 5%.	Accepted.
8th (2022)	Parties should review the requirement and appropriate level for the Dog Handlers’ Allowance.	Accepted.
9th (2023)	A consolidated increase of 7% to all police officer pay points for all ranks up to and including assistant chief constable and commander.	Accepted.
9th (2023)	The removal of pay point 0 of the constable pay scale.	Accepted.
9th (2023)	Point 3 of the chief superintendent pay scale to be uplifted by £2,838 from 1 September 2023 and £2,837 from 1 September 2024. These uplifts are to be made before the application of the respective pay awards for these years.	Accepted.
9th (2023)	London Weighting to be uprated by 7%.	Accepted.
9th (2023)	Dog Handlers’ Allowance to be uprated by 7%.	Accepted.
9th (2023)	The introduction of a new pay structure for those appointed as a chief constable or deputy chief constable from 1 September 2023 comprising three pay points for chief constables, and with deputy chief constable pay set at 82.5% of equivalent chief constable pay. Any chief constable or deputy chief constable who resigns or retires from the police service, and is subsequently reappointed to the same post within the same force, is to be reappointed on no more than their previous salary.	Accepted.
9th (2023)	A consolidated increase of 5% to all existing chief constable and deputy chief constable pay points from 1 September 2023. To start the transition between the existing and new structures, where an existing pay point remains below the pay for the same post in the new pay structure, that pay point is to receive an additional consolidated award of up to 2%, such that the overall uplift does not exceed 7%.	Accepted.
9th (2023)	Policing parties to bring forward proposals to improve the independence, transparency and consistency of determining and reporting on chief officer pay and allowances. We expect this to include proposals on how to place, in the public domain on an annual basis, a consistent set of data on the total pay and allowances received by each chief officer in each force.	Accepted.
9th (2023)	A consolidated increase of 5% to the pay points of all chief officers in the Metropolitan Police Service and the City of London Police above the rank of commander.	Accepted.
9th (2023)	A consolidated increase of an additional 2% to the Metropolitan Police Service deputy assistant commissioner pay point in order to retain the link with deputy chief constable pay.	Accepted.
9th (2023)	The Relocation Allowance for chief officers to be amended as proposed by the chief officer remuneration review. The impact of the scheme to be reviewed within three years of implementation.	Accepted.
9th (2023)	Policing parties to bring forward next year additional proposals for a review of the existing power of Police and Crime Commissioners to increase and decrease base pay of chief constables by plus or minus 10% on appointment. As an interim measure, the Home Office to issue guidance to Police and Crime Commissioners advising them against exercising their power to vary starting salaries on appointment until the review is concluded.	Accepted.
9th (2023)	The National Police Chiefs’ Council to provide an interim report by 30 November 2023 on its progress to develop a long-term pay and reward strategy. This should include an update on the work on constable base pay and the back-to-first-principles review of the P-factor.	Accepted.
10th (2024)	The Home Office, the NPCC and Association of Police and Crime Commissioners (APCC) to work together as a matter of urgency to undertake a Comprehensive Review of police remuneration focused on examining pay and the mechanics of the coherence of pay scales, allowances, rewarding performance and the mechanism for progression, in order to produce a costed plan in preparation for the next Comprehensive Spending Review. As part of the review, the police service should ask itself some fundamental questions regarding the skills and capabilities it requires to deliver the best outcomes for the public, and how it can attract and retain those skills. We invite the Home Office, NPCC and APCC to provide a plan we can consider by January 2025.	Welcomed but subject to further discussions and must be aligned to a police workforce strategy.
10th (2024)	A consolidated increase of 4.75% to all police officer pay points for all ranks up to and including chief superintendent.	Accepted.
10th (2024)	The chief officer of police in each force be given the discretion to set the starting salary for new constables at either pay point 1 or pay point 2 on the constable pay scale.	Accepted but subject to detailed proposals from the NPCC and the APCC on the circumstances in which this discretion should be used, along with transition arrangements for those constables on pay point 1, to inform amendments to the Police Regulations 2003.
10th (2024)	The Commissioners of the Metropolitan Police Service and City of London Police be given further discretion to set the starting salaries of new constables at pay point 3 on the constable pay scale. This additional flexibility should be limited to a period of two years, and be reviewed after one year.	Rejected. Instead, London Allowance for officers appointed on or after 1 September 1994 will be increased by £1,250.
10th (2024)	The allowances set out in the NPCC’s schedule for the review of police allowances be reviewed in their entirety in 2024/25 as part of the Comprehensive Review of police remuneration. A coherent and equitable package of proposals for changes to those allowances should be presented to us in the next pay round for implementation in 2025/26.	Welcomed but subject to further discussions and must be aligned to a police workforce strategy.
10th (2024)	On-call Allowance be increased from £20 to £25 as an interim measure pending the outcome of the NPCC’s review of allowances in 2024/25.	Accepted.
10th (2024)	London Weighting be uprated by 4.75%.	Accepted.
10th (2024)	Dog Handlers’ Allowance be uprated by 4.75% and the additional rate for officers with more than one dog be raised from 25% to 50% of the rate for the first dog.	Accepted.
10th (2024)	The time it takes the federated ranks to reach the maximum annual leave entitlement of 30 days be reduced from 20 to 10 years. Implementation of this change to be in line with the proposals put forward by the NPCC. In advance of that, from September 2024 the annual leave for new entrants also be increased from 22 to 25 days.	Accepted subject to the submission of a satisfactory Equality Impact Assessment by the NPCC to the Home Office for the change from 20 to 10 years, and to the increase in leave entitlement from 22 to 25 days taking effect from 1 April 2025.
11th (2025)	A consolidated increase of 4.2% to all police officer pay points for all ranks up to and including chief superintendent.	Accepted.
11th (2025)	On-call Allowance to be increased from £25 to £35.	Accepted.
11th (2025)	The current three bands for the Motor Vehicle Allowance essential users’ lump sum, linked to engine size of the vehicle, to be replaced with a single allowance of £1,239 irrespective of the engine size.	Accepted.
11th (2025)	The Away from Home Overnight Allowance to be increased by £10 from £50 to £60.	Accepted.
11th (2025)	The Hardship Allowance to be increased by £10 from £30 to £40.	Accepted.
11th (2025)	London Weighting to be uprated by 4.2%.	Accepted.
