= King's Consent =

UK and Commonwealth parliamentary convention

In the UK and certain other Commonwealth countries, King's Consent is a parliamentary convention under which Crown consent is sought whenever a proposed parliamentary bill will affect the Crown's own prerogatives or interests (hereditary revenues, personal property, estates, or other interests). It is known as Queen's Consent when the monarch is female, or Royal Consent in Canada and Crown Consent in Scotland. Prince's Consent is a similar doctrine, under which consent of the Prince of Wales must be obtained for matters relating to the Duchy of Cornwall. King's or Prince's Consent must be obtained early in the legislative process, generally before parliament may debate or vote on a bill. In modern times, following the tenets of constitutional monarchy, consent is granted or withheld as advised by government.

According to the 1851 edition of Erskine May, the manual of UK parliamentary practice, the practical advantage of Queen's Consent (as it then was, Queen Victoria being on the throne) was that it enabled the Crown to protect its rights without having to resort to blocking a bill after its passage by refusing royal assent. More recently, there has been criticism of the Crown being consulted on the content of forthcoming bills, and being given "the right and opportunity to shape prospective legislation". Critics allege that even though the Crown may never formally withhold its consent contrary to government advice, the procedure is nevertheless being used to vet and change draft bills before they reach Parliament. One report noted that it was "almost certain that some Bills were changed before introduction in order to address concerns about Crown consent".

== Origins and constitutional basis ==
The origins of King’s Consent are unclear. There is evidence of consent first being invoked in 1728 when George II gave Parliament permission to debate the Suppression of Piracy Bill, which suggests that it has been part of the UK legislative process for several hundred years. Prince’s Consent is a more recent development, probably no later than 1848.

King's Consent is not a right of the monarch or of the Crown under the prerogative. The Office of the Parliamentary Counsel has stated that it is entirely a matter of House procedure. In 2014 the House of Commons Political and Constitutional Reform Committee undertook an investigation into the basis of the practice, and concluded after hearing expert legal and parliamentary evidence that consent is indeed a matter of parliamentary procedure. The committee noted that if Parliament wished to abolish consent it could do so by resolution, without any need for legislation.

The 1851 (2nd) edition of Erskine May: Parliamentary Practice stated that the practice was "founded upon parliamentary usage, which both houses have agreed to observe", and that as a result "it cannot be misconstrued into any interference with the proceedings of parliament". The author defended the practice of prior communication between Parliament and the Crown on the basis that, without Queen’s Consent, if Parliament were to dispose of the interests or affect the prerogative of the Crown against its wishes, the Crown would in any event be able to protect itself by refusing royal assent. Queen's Consent, then, he considered advantageous, as it avoided the need for the Crown to exert its prerogative in such a way. Recent editions of Erskine May drop discussion of the advantages of the practice, and simply state that under certain conditions consent is "required", leaving unsaid the implications of its not being given.

== Bills affected ==
Bills affecting the royal prerogative and the personal property and "personal interests" of the monarch require King's Consent.

In the United Kingdom, as well as bills that affect the prerogative, bills affecting the hereditary revenues of the Duchy of Lancaster or the Duchy of Cornwall require King's Consent. Bills affecting the latter also require Prince's Consent from the Prince of Wales in his capacity as Duke of Cornwall. In certain circumstances, such as for the House of Lords Act 1999, the consent of the Prince of Wales, in his capacity as Earl of Chester or Prince and Great Steward of Scotland, must also be obtained where a bill affects his interests. In 1993, both Queen's Consent and Prince's Consent were required in respect of the Priests (Ordination of Women) Measure 1993 that enabled the ordination of women in the Church of England.

The Office of the Parliamentary Counsel has produced guidance on the need for King's or Prince's Consent and the procedures associated with them.

In Canada, no act of parliament binds the monarch or their rights unless the act states that it does so. King's Consent (or Royal Consent) is typically granted by the governor general on behalf of the sovereign and specially communicated to Parliament. Typically, though, it is expressed by a minister of the Canadian Crown.

In Australia, the royal household insists consent must first be granted for bills that affect the monarch personally. There is no equivalent requirement as in the UK or Canada for the Australian Parliament to receive signification of the monarch's consent.

In New Zealand no bills made by members of parliament that affect the Crown's rights and prerogatives may be passed without the consent of the Crown. The speaker of the House is responsible for ensuring consent from the crown is obtained before bills that require it can be passed. The governor-general is typically the one who gives a message of consent on the advice of the members of parliament.

== Effect on parliamentary proceedings ==
Consent is usually signified in one (in unicameral legislatures) or both houses (in bicameral legislatures) of parliament, at either the second or third reading, by a privy counsellor and is recorded in Hansard. Where proposed legislation which might affect the royal prerogative or the private interests of the Crown is sponsored by the cabinet (as is the case for most bills considered by Parliament), the department sponsoring the bill must write to the palace giving as much time as possible, but never less than 14 days before the bill is introduced to parliament. In the Scottish parliament, consent is signified by a member of the Scottish government. In the Canadian parliament, Royal Consent can be signified in only one legislative chamber. In the UK Parliament, consent is signified using the following wording (with similar wording for Prince's Consent):

I have it in command from His Majesty the King to acquaint the House that His Majesty, having been informed of the purport of the [name of bill], has consented to place his prerogative and interest, so far as it is concerned on behalf of the Crown and the Duchy of Lancaster, at the disposal of Parliament for the purposes of the Measure.

If consent is required but not signified, a bill may make no further progress through Parliament. If a bill is mistakenly allowed to progress even though the required consent was not signified and the error is discovered before royal assent has been given, the proceedings may later be declared void. Where a bill requires the consent of the Prince and Steward of Scotland or the Duke of Rothesay, the Scottish Parliament cannot debate any question whether the bill be passed or approved unless such consent to those provisions has been signified by a member of the Scottish government. Once a bill has passed Parliament and received royal assent, it is regarded as legally valid by the courts, regardless of any deficiency in parliamentary procedure, in accordance with the usual principles of parliamentary privilege.

== Consent granted or withheld on advice of the cabinet ==
On the basis of constitutional monarchy and responsible government, the decision on whether to grant or withhold King's Consent is made on the advice of government ministers, not the monarch alone. A spokesman for Queen Elizabeth II stated in 2021 that "Queen's consent is a parliamentary process, with the role of sovereign purely formal. Consent is always granted by the monarch where requested by government. Any assertion that the sovereign has blocked legislation is simply incorrect."

Similarly, the Prince of Wales grants and withholds the Prince's Consent on the advice of the sovereign's ministers, as the Duchy of Cornwall is within British jurisdiction. No bill affecting the Duchy of Cornwall has been refused consent by either the sovereign or the Duke of Cornwall. Each granting of consent by the Prince of Wales is a "matter of public record".

While the monarch always consents if so advised by ministers, a private member's bill—not introduced by a government minister—that requires consent can be killed off by the government without having to muster votes or use parliamentary time by advising against consent.

In 1999, the Queen, acting on ministerial advice, refused to signify her consent to Parliament debating the Military Action Against Iraq (Parliamentary Approval) Bill. This was a private member's bill which sought to transfer from government (strictly speaking, the monarch acting on ministerial advice) to Parliament the power to authorize military strikes against Iraq. This prevented the bill from being debated. In 1988, the Palace of Westminster (Removal of Crown Immunity) Bill could not be debated in Parliament because Queen's Consent was withheld, and consideration of the Reform of the House of Lords Bill in 1990 was delayed though consent was signified later.

== Vetting of bills under consent procedure ==
While the website of the royal family describes consent as "a long established convention", The Guardian newspaper reported in February 2021 that memos had been found in the National Archives revealing that the advance notice of forthcoming bills allows the monarch to lobby for legislative changes without actual consent being invoked. The documents were reviewed by Thomas Adams, a specialist in constitutional law at Oxford University, who said they revealed "the kind of influence over legislation that lobbyists would only dream of", adding that the existence of the consent procedure appeared to have given the monarch "substantial influence" over draft laws that could affect her. As of 2021, over 1000 bills had been submitted to the Queen or Prince Charles for Queen's or Prince's Consent. More than 50,000 people had, by 28 February 2021, signed a petition requesting a parliamentary inquiry into the convention of Queen's Consent. Buckingham Palace responded to The Guardian, stating that consent was always granted when requested and that legislation was never blocked.

The Palace is known to have requested changes to draft legislation in some cases; it is not known how many. In 1973, when a companies bill incorporating transparency measures was to be introduced in the UK Parliament, after receiving advance notice as required by the consent procedure, the Queen's lawyer and the trade department agreed an exception for heads of state. This allowed the Queen to avoid the embarrassment of disclosure of beneficial ownership of shares by the Crown until at least 2011. Consent was not required for the bill, as eventually introduced. It was revealed in 2022 that Prince Charles had used Prince's Consent to have proposed legislation changed so that his Duchy of Cornwall leasehold tenants would not have the right to buy their homes that was provided by what later became the Leasehold Reform, Housing and Urban Development Act 1993. Documents revealed that Charles wrote to the Prime Minister John Major expressing his "particular concern" about this aspect. The government did not wish to grant this exception, fearing that it would create a precedent for other major landowners, but ultimately, reluctantly, included the special exemption to avoid what a Whitehall official described as "a major row with the Prince of Wales", saying "the will of ministers can prevail over that of monarchy but a constitutional crisis would add a further dimension of controversy to the bill which would be better avoided". Acts that are known to have been vetted by Prince Charles are the Leasehold Reform Act 1967, the Leasehold Reform, Housing and Urban Development Act 1993, and the Commonhold and Leasehold Reform Act 2002.

It was reported in July 2021 that the advance notice provided by the consent procedure was used in the Scottish Parliament in 2021 to arrange for draft legislation to be modified so that the Queen, one of the largest landowners in Scotland, would become the only person in the country not required to facilitate the construction of pipelines to heat buildings using renewable energy. The Scottish government did not disclose the intervention of the Queen's lawyer when the energy minister added the exemption to the green energy bill, key legislation to combat the climate emergency. It is not known why the Queen's lawyer wanted the bill changed. Since its creation in 1999 the Scottish Parliament has given the Queen advance notice of at least 67 parliamentary bills deemed to affect her. It is not known how many were consequently changed. The Scottish Liberal Democrat leader Willie Rennie asked the Scottish government in a parliamentary question for a list of acts amended as a result of exchanges with the Queen's representatives; the Scottish government ultimately refused to answer the question, but confidential briefing notes were later disclosed which said that it was almost certain that some bills had been changed before introduction, but that as they had not been "amended" in parliamentary terms they would not have been included.

In response to these reports about consent in Scotland, the palace said: "The royal household can be consulted on bills in order to ensure the technical accuracy and consistency of the application of the bill to the crown, a complex legal principle governed by statute and common law. This process does not change the nature of any such bill."

== See also ==
- Constitutional conventions of the United Kingdom

== Bibliography ==
- House of Commons Political and Constitutional Reform Committee (2014). The impact of Queen's and Prince's Consent on the legislative process: Eleventh Report of Session 2013–14 (PDF) (Report). The Stationery Office, The House of Commons.
