= Bulk personal datasets =

UK government euphemism

"Bulk personal datasets" is the UK government's euphemism for datasets containing personally identifiable information on a large number of individuals, as part of mass surveillance in the United Kingdom and on citizens around the world.

The term was first used publicly in March 2015 by the Intelligence and Security Committee of Parliament, and has been subject to significant controversy.

Other UK Government departments have programmes utilising bulk personal datasets, one of which is the care.data programme in the Department of Health and National Health Service. In health, bulk personal datasets are created as a by-product of providing direct care.

== Controversy ==
The judicial body which oversees the intelligence services in the United Kingdom, the Investigatory Powers Tribunal, ruled that the legislative framework in the United Kingdom does not permit mass surveillance and that while GCHQ collects and analyses data in bulk, it does not practice mass surveillance. A special report published by the Intelligence and Security Committee of Parliament also came to this view, although it found past shortcomings in oversight and said the legal framework should be simplified to improve transparency. This view is supported by independent reports from the Interception of Communications Commissioner. However, notable campaign groups and broadsheet newspapers continue to express strong views to the contrary, while others have criticised these viewpoints in turn.
