= Wilson Doctrine =

UK security protocol introduced in 1966

The Wilson Doctrine is a convention in the United Kingdom that restricts the police and intelligence services from tapping the telephones of members of the House of Commons and House of Lords. It was introduced in 1966 and named after Harold Wilson, the Labour Prime Minister who established the rule. Since it was established, the development of new forms of communication, such as mobile phones and email, has led to extensions of the doctrine. However, it was never extended to cover members of the new devolved legislatures.

For a period, GCHQ chose to also apply the same principle to members of the devolved legislatures, but in July 2015 it emerged that the application of the principle to members of the European Parliament and devolved legislatures had been ended.

In October 2015, the Investigatory Powers Tribunal ruled that the doctrine had no legal force. In November 2015, Prime Minister David Cameron made a statement clarifying how the "Government continues to apply the doctrine in the twenty first century". The Investigatory Powers Act 2016 requires that warrants to intercept the communications of MPs, Lords, members of the devolved legislatures, or (when they existed) UK MEPs must also gain the authorisation of the Prime Minister.

== Introduction ==
Following a spate of scandals involving alleged telephone bugging of MPs, Prime Minister Harold Wilson gave a pledge to MPs that their phones would not be tapped:

With my right hon. Friends, I reviewed the practice when we came to office and decided on balance – and the arguments were very fine – that the balance should be tipped the other way and that I should give this instruction that there was to be no tapping of the telephones of members of Parliament. That was our decision and that is our policy.

However the pledge was qualified in two respects, as the Interception of Communications Commissioner made clear in his 2005–06 Annual Report:

But if there was any development of a kind which required a change in the general policy, I would, at such moment as seemed compatible with the security of the country, on my own initiative make a statement to the House about it.

This meant that the Prime Minister could reverse the doctrine in the interests of national security, and that he did not need to reveal such to the House of Commons until he chose to do so.

== Re-assessment ==
Subsequent prime ministers have regularly confirmed that the ban remains in place, but in January 2006 the Interception of Communications Commissioner, Swinton Thomas, asked the government to reconsider the implications of the doctrine on the regulatory framework established under the Regulation of Investigatory Powers Act 2000. Prime Minister Tony Blair confirmed he would be considering whether or not the ban should be lifted, in order to comply with the act.

However, in March 2006 – in a written ministerial statement – Tony Blair said that following a period of fresh consultation, he had decided the 'Wilson doctrine' would remain in place.

In February 2007, Thomas again called for the ban to be removed, saying:

It is fundamental to the constitution of this country that no one is above the law or is seen to be above the law. But in this instance, MPs and peers are anything but equal with the rest of the citizens of this country and are above the law.

In September 2007 Prime Minister Gordon Brown reaffirmed the doctrine as "The Wilson Doctrine applies to all forms of interception that are subject to authorisation by Secretary of State warrant."

== Public debate ==
In February 2008 it was reported that Sadiq Khan, who was then an MP, had been bugged whilst talking to a constituent in Woodhill Prison. However, since this appeared to have been a face-to-face conversation, even if it was bugged, it may not have been a literal breach of the Wilson Doctrine. An inquiry was launched by Justice Secretary Jack Straw.

Further questions about the validity of the doctrine arose in November 2008 after the home and parliamentary offices of Damian Green MP were searched by the Metropolitan Police. Other questions in the Lords asked whether communications which had been stored were protected by the same doctrine.

== 2015 Investigatory Powers Tribunal case ==
Following the global surveillance disclosures by Edward Snowden, three parliamentarians took a case in 2015 to the Investigatory Powers Tribunal (IPT) that the Wilson Doctrine was being broken. GCHQ's QC argued that the Wilson Doctrine "does not have force in law and cannot impose legal restraints on the agencies", so the doctrine only has a political effect, and that excluding politicians from mass surveillance was not feasible. The IPT ruled in favour of GCHQ in October 2015. Subsequently, the Home Secretary said in Parliament that the protection of MPs' communications from being intercepted still applies but does not extend to a blanket ban on surveillance.

== Investigatory Powers Act 2016 ==
The Investigatory Powers Act 2016 does not codify the Wilson Doctrine, in that it does not forbid the interception of communications of MPs. However, it does codify the prime minister's power to maintain or reverse this ban, and adds an extra hurdle to cross before this interception can happen, in that section 26 provides that warrants to intercept the communications of MPs, Lords, and members of the devolved legislatures must also gain the authorisation of the Prime Minister (as well as the relevant Secretary of State and a Judicial Commissioner as for all other IPA warrants). Until exit day it also applied to members of the European Parliament elected for the UK. This provision came into force on 31 May 2018.

== See also ==
- Harold Wilson conspiracy theories
- Mass surveillance in the United Kingdom
- Spycatcher, a book alleging some staff of MI5 plotted against Harold Wilson's government
