= Investigatory Powers Act 2016 =

Act of the Parliament of the United Kingdom

Investigatory Powers Act 2016 (Note: Section 272(8).)
- Act of Parliament
- Parliament of the United Kingdom
- Long title: Click "show" An Act to make provision about the interception of communications, equipment interference and the acquisition and retention of communications data, bulk personal datasets and other information; to make provision about the treatment of material held as a result of such interception, equipment interference or acquisition or retention; to establish the Investigatory Powers Commissioner and other Judicial Commissioners and make provision about them and other oversight arrangements; to make further provision about investigatory powers and national security; to amend sections 3 and 5 of the Intelligence Services Act 1994; and for connected purposes.
- Citation: 2016 c. 25
- Introduced by: Theresa May (Home Secretary) (Commons); The Earl Howe, (Deputy Leader (Lords)) (Lords)
- Territorial extent: England and Wales; Scotland; Northern Ireland; (Note: Section 272(4)–(7).)

Dates
- Royal assent: 29 November 2016
- Commencement: Various (Note: Section 272(1)–(3).)
Other legislation
Amends	Telecommunications Act 1984; Official Secrets Act 1989; Security Service Act 1989; Social Security Administration Act 1992; Social Security Administration (Northern Ireland) Act 1992; Intelligence Services Act 1994; Criminal Procedure and Investigations Act 1996; Police Act 1997; Scotland Act 1998; Northern Ireland Act 1998; Scotland Act 1998 (Cross-Border Public Authorities) (Adaptation of Functions etc.) Order 1999; Financial Services and Markets Act 2000; Regulation of Investigatory Powers Act 2000; Insolvency Act 2000; Political Parties, Elections and Referendums Act 2000; Regulation of Investigatory Powers (Scotland) Act 2000; Scotland Act 1998 (Transfer of Functions to the Scottish Ministers etc.) (No. 2) Order 2000; Social Security Fraud Act 2001; Anti-terrorism, Crime and Security Act 2001; Social Security Fraud Act (Northern Ireland) 2001; Justice (Northern Ireland) Act 2002; Proceeds of Crime Act 2002; Police Reform Act 2002; Communications Act 2003; Audit and Accountability (Northern Ireland) Order 2003; Public Audit (Wales) Act 2004; Insolvency Act 2000 (Company Directors Disqualification Undertakings) Order 2004; Inquiries Act 2005; Constitutional Reform Act 2005; Commissioners for Revenue and Customs Act 2005; Terrorism Act 2006; Wireless Telegraphy Act 2006; National Health Service (Consequential Provisions) Act 2006; Armed Forces Act 2006; Tribunals, Courts and Enforcement Act 2007; Serious Crime Act 2007; Legal Services Act 2007; Police, Public Order and Criminal Justice (Scotland) Act 2006 (Consequential Provisions and Modifications) Order 2007; Regulatory Enforcement and Sanctions Act 2008; Counter-Terrorism Act 2008; Borders, Citizenship and Immigration Act 2009; Marine and Coastal Access Act 2009; Policing and Crime Act 2009; Companies Act 2006 (Consequential Amendments, Transitional Provisions and Savings) Order 2009; Terrorist Asset-Freezing etc. Act 2010; Marine (Scotland) Act 2010; Criminal Justice and Licensing (Scotland) Act 2010; Charities Act 2011; Terrorism Prevention and Investigation Measures Act 2011; Police Reform and Social Responsibility Act 2011; Regulation of Investigatory Powers (Monetary Penalty Notices and Consents for Interceptions) Regulations 2011; Prisons (Interference with Wireless Telegraphy) Act 2012; Health and Social Care Act 2012; Protection of Freedoms Act 2012; Justice and Security Act 2013; Crime and Courts Act 2013; Marine Act (Northern Ireland) 2013; Police and Fire Reform (Scotland) Act 2012 (Consequential Provisions and Modifications) Order 2013; Local Audit and Accountability Act 2014; Anti-social Behaviour, Crime and Policing Act 2014; Data Retention and Investigatory Powers Act 2014; Counter-Terrorism and Security Act 2015; Serious Crime Act 2015; Immigration Act 2016
Amended by	Policing and Crime Act 2017; Criminal Justice (European Investigation Order) Regulations 2017; Sanctions and Anti-Money Laundering Act 2018; Data Protection Act 2018; European Parliamentary Elections Etc. (Repeal, Revocation, Amendment and Saving Provisions) (United Kingdom and Gibraltar) (EU Exit) Regulations 2018; Investigatory Powers (Codes of Practice and Miscellaneous Amendments) Order 2018; Data Retention and Acquisition Regulations 2018; Crime (Overseas Production Orders) Act 2019; Law Enforcement and Security (Amendment) (EU Exit) Regulations 2019; Sentencing Act 2020; Communications Data Acquisition Regulations 2019; Functions of the Investigatory Powers Commissioner (Oversight of the Data Access Agreement between the United Kingdom and the United States of America and of functions exercisable under the Crime (Overseas Production Orders) Act 2019) Regulations 2020; Investigatory Powers (Communications Data) (Relevant Public Authorities and Designated Senior Officers) Regulations 2020; Armed Forces Act 2021; Covert Human Intelligence Sources (Criminal Conduct) Act 2021; Criminal Justice Act 2003 (Commencement No. 33) and Sentencing Act 2020 (Commencement No. 2) Regulations 2022; Investigatory Powers Commissioner (Oversight Functions) Regulations 2022; Finance (No. 2) Act 2023; National Security Act 2023; Northern Ireland Troubles (Legacy and Reconciliation) Act 2023; Judicial Review and Courts Act 2022 (Magistrates’ Court Sentencing Powers) Regulations 2023; Investigatory Powers (Amendment) Act 2024; Investigatory Powers Act 2016 (Remedial) Order 2024; Data (Use and Access) Act 2025; Employment Rights Act 2025; Public Authorities (Fraud, Error and Recovery) Act 2025; Investigatory Powers (Communications Data) (Relevant Public Authorities and Designated Senior Officers) Regulations 2025

Status: Amended

History of passage through Parliament

Text of statute as originally enacted

Revised text of statute as amended

The Investigatory Powers Act 2016 (c. 25) (nicknamed the Snoopers' Charter) is an act of the Parliament of the United Kingdom which received royal assent on 29 November 2016. Its different parts came into force on various dates from 30 December 2016. The act comprehensively sets out and in limited respects expands the electronic surveillance powers of the British intelligence agencies and police. It also claims to improve the safeguards on the exercise of those powers.

The act was amended by the Investigatory Powers (Amendment) Act 2024, following a review by Lord Anderson of Ipswich, the person who originally proposed the Act.

== Drafting and scrutiny ==
In 2014 the British government asked David Anderson, the Independent Reviewer of Terrorism Legislation, to review the operation and regulation of investigatory powers available to law enforcement and intelligence agencies, in particular the interception of communications and communications data, and to recommend change. This report was published in June 2015 and recommended a new law to clarify these powers.

The Draft Investigatory Powers Bill was published in November 2015, with a large number of accompanying documents, and a Joint Committee of the House of Commons and House of Lords was established to scrutinise the draft bill. Some parts of the bill referring to bulk personal datasets came into effect in November 2015, before parliamentary scrutiny began. The Joint Committee published its pre-legislative scrutiny report in March 2016. The Government accepted the vast majority of its 198 recommendations, together with the recommendations of two other parliamentary committees that had scrutinised the draft Bill, and the revised bill was introduced in the House of Commons, where it was subject to debate by Members of Parliament.

In March 2016 the House of Commons passed the Investigatory Powers Bill on its second reading by 281 votes to 15, moving the bill to the committee stage. The Labour Party and Scottish National Party abstained from the vote, while the Liberal Democrats voted against it.

At the committee stage, constitutional matters, technology, and human rights issues were examined. The Labour Chair of the Joint Committee on Human Rights, Harriet Harman, said:

The Bill provides a clear and transparent basis for powers already in use by the security and intelligence services, but there need to be further safeguards. Protection for MP communications from unjustified interference is vital, as it is for confidential communications between lawyers and clients, and for journalists' sources, the Bill must provide tougher safeguards to ensure that the Government cannot abuse its powers to undermine Parliament's ability to hold the Government to account.

At this stage, at the insistence of the Labour Party, the Independent Reviewer of Terrorism Legislation was commissioned to conduct a further review of the operational case for the bulk powers reserved under the Bill to the British intelligence agencies: bulk interception, bulk collection of metadata, bulk equipment interference and the retention and use of bulk datasets. That review was conducted with the help of a small, security-cleared expert team, and published together with 60 case studies in August 2016. Like the 2014-15 reports of the PCLOB and National Academy of Sciences in the US, it is a significant information source for the utility of so-called mass surveillance techniques

On 16 November 2016 the House of Lords approved the final version of the Investigatory Powers Bill, leaving only the formality of Royal Assent to be completed before the Bill became law.

On 21 December 2016, the European Court of Justice (ECJ) declared that the generalised retention of certain types of personal data is unlawful, although little is known as to how this will affect the Investigatory Powers Act at this stage. As of 29 January 2017, many sources have since reported on the Investigatory Powers Act as if it is currently in action. Draft codes of practice laid out by the Home Office in February 2017 did not provide insight on the Government's communications data code of practise, as it was for the Court of Appeal to decide how to apply the December ruling of the ECJ on data retention in member states. It was then reported in late February 2017 that the aspects of the Bill forcing communications service providers to retain data had been "mothballed" due to the ECJ ruling on the "general and indiscriminate" retention of communications data being illegal.

== Provisions of the Act ==
The Act:

- introduced new powers, and restated existing ones, for British intelligence agencies and law enforcement to carry out targeted interception of communications, bulk collection of communications data, and bulk interception of communications;
- created an Investigatory Powers Commission (IPC) to oversee the use of all investigatory powers, alongside the oversight provided by the Intelligence and Security Committee of Parliament and the Investigatory Powers Tribunal. The IPC consists of a number of serving or former senior judges. It combined and replaced the powers of the Interception of Communications Commissioner, Intelligence Services Commissioner, and Chief Surveillance Commissioner;
- established a requirement for a judge serving on the IPC to review warrants for accessing the content of communications and equipment interference authorised by a Secretary of State before they come into force;
- required communication service providers (CSPs) to retain British internet users' "Internet connection records" – which websites were visited but not the particular pages and not the full browsing history – for one year;
- allowed police, intelligence officers and other government department managers (listed below) to see the Internet connection records, as part of a targeted and filtered investigation, without a warrant;
- permitted the police and intelligence agencies to carry out targeted equipment interference, that is, hacking into computers or devices to access their data, and bulk equipment interference for national security matters related to foreign investigations;
- placed a legal obligation on CSPs to assist with targeted interception of data, and communications and equipment interference in relation to an investigation; foreign companies are not required to engage in bulk collection of data or communications;
- maintained an existing requirement on CSPs in the UK to have the ability to remove encryption applied by the CSP; foreign companies are not required to remove encryption;
- put the Wilson Doctrine on a statutory footing for the first time as well as safeguards for other sensitive professions such as journalists, lawyers and doctors;
- provided local government with some investigatory powers, for example to investigate someone fraudulently claiming benefits, but not access to Internet connection records;
- created a new criminal offence for unlawfully accessing internet data;
- created a new criminal offence for a CSP or someone who works for a CSP to reveal that data has been requested.

=== Investigatory Powers Commissioner ===
The Act created the role of Investigatory Powers Commissioner to provide independent oversight of the use of investigatory powers by intelligence agencies, police forces and other public authorities. In March 2017 Lord Justice Sir Adrian Fulford, a Court of Appeal judge, was appointed as first Commissioner for a three-year term. His office (IPCO) will have fifteen senior judges as judicial commissioners, a technical advisory panel of scientific experts, and around 50 staff. The Act gives the prime minister the power to appoint the Investigatory Powers Commissioner and other Judicial Commissioners.

In January 2019 the Home Office blocked the appointment of Eric King as head of investigations at IPCO, citing national security grounds. King had previously been director of the Don't Spy On Us coalition, and deputy director of Privacy International for five years. King commented "The problem, at its heart, is that there’s a conflict as to whether my previous work and views are a positive or negative thing. They are both the reason I was hired and the reason my clearance was refused by the Home Office vetting team."

Investigatory Powers Commissioners have been:

- March 2017 – October 2019 Sir Adrian Fulford
- October 2019 – present Sir Brian Leveson

=== Investigatory Powers (Technical Capability) Regulations ===
Investigatory Powers (Technical Capability) Regulations 2018
- Statutory Instrument
- Parliament of the United Kingdom
- Citation: SI 2018/353

Dates
- Made: 8 March 2018
Other legislation
Made under	Investigatory Powers Act 2016

Text of statute as originally enacted

The Investigatory Powers (Technical Capability) Regulations 2018 (SI 2018/353) is a statutory instrument set up under the provisions of section 267(3)(i) of the act. It makes provision for the Secretary of State to issue "technical capability notices" to "relevant operators" that require them to give the British government access to their systems.

=== Authorities allowed to access Internet connection records ===
List of authorities allowed to access Internet connection records without a warrant:

- Metropolitan Police Service
- City of London Police
- Police forces maintained under section 2 of the Police Act 1996
- Police Service of Scotland
- Police Service of Northern Ireland
- British Transport Police
- Ministry of Defence Police
- Royal Navy Police
- Royal Military Police
- Royal Air Force Police
- Security Service
- Secret Intelligence Service
- GCHQ
- Ministry of Defence
- Department of Health
- Home Office
- Ministry of Justice
- National Crime Agency
- HM Revenue & Customs
- Department for Transport
- Department for Work and Pensions
- NHS trusts and foundation trusts in England that provide ambulance services
- NHS National Services Scotland
- Competition and Markets Authority
- Criminal Cases Review Commission
- Department for Communities (Northern Ireland)
- Department for the Economy (Northern Ireland)
- Department of Justice (Northern Ireland)
- Financial Conduct Authority
- Fire and rescue authorities under the Fire and Rescue Services Act 2004
- Food Standards Agency
- Food Standards Scotland
- Gambling Commission
- Gangmasters and Labour Abuse Authority
- Health and Safety Executive
- Independent Police Complaints Commission
- Information Commissioner
- NHS Business Services Authority
- Northern Ireland Ambulance Service Health and Social Care Trust
- Northern Ireland Fire and Rescue Service Board
- Health & Social Care Business Services Organisation (Northern Ireland)
- Office of Communications
- Police Ombudsman for Northern Ireland
- Police Investigations and Review Commissioner
- Scottish Ambulance Service Board
- Scottish Criminal Cases Review Commission
- Serious Fraud Office
- Welsh Ambulance Services National Health Service Trust

== Public debate ==
Does the UK really want the dubious honor of introducing powers deemed too intrusive by all other major democracies, joining the likes of China and Russia in collecting everyone's browsing habits?

— Anne Jellema, head of the World Wide Web Foundation

The draft bill generated significant public debate about balancing intrusive powers and mass surveillance with the needs of the police and intelligence agencies to gain targeted access to information as part of their investigations. Although the Home Office said the bill would be compatible with the European Convention on Human Rights, the content of the draft Bill has raised concerns about the impact on privacy.

Privacy campaigners say the bill clearly lays out the mass surveillance powers that would be at the disposal of the security services, and want it amended so that the surveillance is targeted and based on suspicion and argue that the powers are so sweeping, and the bill's language so general, that not just the security services but also government bodies will be able to analyse the records of millions of people even if they are not under suspicion.

In January 2016 a report published by the Intelligence and Security Committee of Parliament recommended that the bill should focus on the right to privacy. Committee chairman, Conservative MP Dominic Grieve, said: "We have therefore recommended that the new legislation contains an entirely new part dedicated to overarching privacy protections, which should form the backbone of the draft legislation around which the exceptional powers are then built. This will ensure that privacy is an integral part of the legislation rather than an add-on." The committee also recommended that Class bulk personal dataset warrants are removed from the legislation. Dominic Grieve later clarified the extent of these freedoms, "the principle of the right to privacy against the state is maintained except if there is a good and sufficient reason why that should not happen."

Gavin E. L. Hall, a doctoral researcher at the University of Birmingham, argues that public fear of the bill is not justified, writing that there are benefits to formally codifying in law what state security services can and cannot do and that "While it may technically be possible under the bill to impugn individual freedom, John Bull has little to fear."

The Register argued the Act enshrines parallel construction in law and allows the state to lie about the origins of evidence in court, treating it as infallible, and prohibit the defendant from questioning it.

Article 19, a freedom of expression campaign group, criticized the act as one of the most draconian pieces of surveillance legislation passed worldwide, warning that it "offers a template for authoritarian regimes and seriously undermining the rights of its citizens to privacy and freedom of expression". The Chinese government cited the Snooper's Charter (officially the Draft Communications Data Bill) when defending its own intrusive anti-terrorism legislation.

Recent Wikileaks articles suggest that phone and digital device tracking both direct and indirect (e.g. FM radio blipping via Android exploit) also mentioned in The Register posts by "Anonymous Coward" to covertly follow subjects have been used in the past but for operational reasons it is not clear if they are still used. The original poster has since decided to cooperate with the authorities and not comment further publicly on this subject, though the technique was independently rediscovered before the article in question was released.

== Legal challenge and ruling ==
In November 2016, a petition demanding the law be repealed gained 100,000 signatures. In December 2016, pornographic media site xHamster redirected UK traffic to the petition. In March 2017, Liberty, a human rights organisation, raised £50,000 via crowd funding towards legal actions against the bill. Silkie Carlo, policy officer at Liberty, said:

The powers we're fighting undermine everything that's core to our freedom and democracy — our right to protest, to express ourselves freely and to a fair trial, our free press, privacy and cybersecurity. But with so much public support behind us, we're hopeful we will be able to persuade our courts to restrain the more authoritarian tendencies of this Government.

— Silkie Carlo, policy officer at Liberty

In April 2018 the High Court of Justice ruled that the Investigatory Powers Act violates EU law. The government had until 1 November 2018 to amend the legislation. On 31 October 2018 The Data Retention and Acquisition Regulations 2018 came into force to address this ruling. These regulations increased the threshold for accessing communications data only for the purposes of serious crime (defined as offences which are capable of being sentenced to imprisonment for a term of 12 months or more) and requires that authorities consult an independent Investigatory Powers Commissioner before requesting data. The regulations also included a loophole where rapid approval can be made internally without independent approval but with a three-day expiry and with subsequent review by the independent body. Most debates about the regulations have been about the definition of "serious crime" with many arguing that the threshold should be at three years. Liberty has taken legal action over a number of years, with mixed success, losing a challenge on human rights grounds in 2019, but successfully arguing in 2023 "that the regime for sharing material from bulk personal datasets with overseas states is unlawful".

== Implementation ==
It was revealed in 2021 that two British ISPs were collaborating on a government initiative for the collection of Internet Connection Records.

== Uses ==
On 7 February 2025, US media reports revealed that Apple Inc had received a "technical capability notice" under the Act, ordering them to break the encryption on iCloud backups worldwide. The public disclosure of such orders would be illegal. Apple could appeal to a confidential technical panel over the expense of implementation, and to a judge over the proportionality of the notice, but Apple would have to comply during the appeal process.

== See also ==
- Investigatory Powers (Technical Capability) Regulations 2018
- Intelligence Act (France)
- Draft Communications Data Bill, a draft bill produced for consultation in 2012 but never introduced to Parliament
- Gesetz zur Beschränkung des Brief-, Post- und Fernmeldegeheimnisses (German law)
- Mass surveillance in the United Kingdom
- Patriot Act
