= Paul Kennedy (English judge) =

British jurist (born 1935)

The Right Honourable Sir Paul Kennedy

Lord Justice of Appeal
- In office 1992–2005

Personal details
- Born: Paul Joseph Morrow Kennedy; 12 June 1935 (age 90) Sheffield, England
- Profession: Barrister

Sir Paul Joseph Morrow Kennedy, PC (born 12 June 1935) is an English jurist. He is a former vice-president of the Queen's Bench Division of the High Court of Justice of England and Wales, and former Interception of Communications Commissioner.

== Life ==
Kennedy was born in northern England in Sheffield, Yorkshire, in 1935. He studied at Ampleforth College in North Yorkshire and at Gonville and Caius College, Cambridge, and received his final law training at Sheffield University.

In 1960 Kennedy was admitted to legal practice as a barrister via Gray's Inn, and in 1973 he took silk (became Queen's Counsel). From 1971 to 1983 Kennedy served as the recorder on the North Eastern Circuit. In 1983 he was appointed as a justice of the High Court, assigned to the Queen's Bench Division, where he served until 1992. He was the presiding judge of the North Eastern Circuit from 1985 to 1989.

From 1992 to 2005 Kennedy was an appellate judge on the Court of Appeal of England and Wales, known as a Lord Justice of Appeal. From 1997 to 2002 he also served as the vice-president of the Queen's Bench Division.

In 2006, Kennedy was appointed as Interception of Communications Commissioner (ICC) by Tony Blair for the standard three-year term. In April 2009, he was reappointed for a second term by Gordon Brown. Kennedy served until December 2012, and was succeeded by Sir Anthony May in January 2013. In 2014, Kennedy served an additional six months as Interception of Communications Commissioner due to the convalescence of Anthony May from an accident.

Also in 2006 Kennedy was appointed to the Court of Appeal in Gibraltar, where he became president in December 2011.

In 2009 he was appointed by the Estimates Committee of the House of Commons to hear appeals from members of parliament (MPs) whose claims for reimbursement and allowances had been denied by the Commons fees office.

== Controversies ==
In 1995, Kennedy was an advisor to a charity that promoted a controversial, brainwashing style rehabilitation program for young offenders reminiscent of that used in Burgess's A Clockwork Orange, for which he was later taken to task by the press.

In 2010, Kennedy on appeal reversed more than 50% of the cases for repayments from MPs that Sir Thomas Legg had demanded. He found that in most cases there was no evidence of wrongdoing, and that it was unfair to call MPs who had not broken the existing rules things such as "tainted" or having "breached the requirements of propriety".

In 2011, while serving as Interception of Communications Commissioner, Kennedy and the Intelligence Services Commissioner, Sir Mark Waller, were ridiculed for allowing their new web site dealing with state security to have open editing access.

== Memberships and awards ==
- Knighted in 1984.
- Member of the Judicial Studies Board and chairman of its Criminal Committee from 1993 to 1996.
- Chairman of the Advocacy Studies Board from 1996 to 1999.
- Member of Queen's Counsel Appointment Panels for England and Wales from 2008 to 2009.
- Member of the Queen's Counsel Appointments Committee for Gibraltar since 2011.
- Honorary fellow at Gonville and Caius College, Cambridge in 1998.
- Honorary LLD from the University of Sheffield in 2000.
