= Covert Human Intelligence Sources (Criminal Conduct) Act 2021 =

Act of the Parliament of the United Kingdom

Covert Human Intelligence Sources (Criminal Conduct) Act 2021 (Note: Section 10(3).)
- Act of Parliament
- Parliament of the United Kingdom
- Long title: An Act to make provision for, and in connection with, the authorisation of criminal conduct in the course of, or otherwise in connection with, the conduct of covert human intelligence sources.
- Citation: 2021 c. 4
- Introduced by: Priti Patel, Secretary of State for the Home Department (Commons); Susan Williams, Baroness Williams of Trafford, Minister of State for Home Affairs (Lords)
- Territorial extent: England and Wales; Scotland; Northern Ireland; (Note: Section 10(1).)

Dates
- Royal assent: 1 March 2021
- Commencement: 1 March 2021 (Sections 9 & 10); By statutory instrument (rest of Act); (Note: Section 10(2).)
Other legislation
Amends	Regulation of Investigatory Powers Act 2000; Regulation of Investigatory Powers (Juveniles) Order 2000; Police Reform Act 2002; Gambling Act 2005; Serious Crime Act 2007; Crime and Courts Act 2013; Investigatory Powers Act 2016; Coronavirus Act 2020

Status: Current legislation

History of passage through Parliament

Text of statute as originally enacted

Revised text of statute as amended

The Covert Human Intelligence Sources (Criminal Conduct) Act 2021 (c. 4) is an act of the Parliament of the United Kingdom. The act makes provision for the use of undercover law enforcement agents and covert sources and the committing of crimes in the undertaking of their duty. It was also referred to as the "Spy Cops Bill" – a reference to the UK undercover policing relationships scandal.

== Background ==
The government stated that the act was drafted in response to a court ruling in December 2019 which permitted, in a marginal decision, MI5 and other agencies to commit crimes in order to prevent more serious crimes from occurring.

As a bill, the act was opposed by a number of political organisations and NGOs, including the international human rights advocacy organisation Amnesty International, the Green Party, Scottish National Party, Sinn Féin, and some Labour and Liberal Democrat MPs. In a statement, Amnesty International said:

It's hugely worrying that we’re a step closer to seeing this deeply dangerous bill become law. MPs are signing off on a licence for government agencies to authorise torture and murder.

Giving such disturbing powers to bodies including MI5 and the police could have devastating impacts.

We are now urging peers who care about the rule of law to introduce urgent amendments before the bill progresses further through Parliament.

The Guardian ran an editorial against the bill, saying it was "unfit for purpose". The Morning Star also ran an editorial against the Bill, noting that "even the equivalent legislation in the United States rules out torture and murder, yet nothing is ruled out in this Bill." Lord Macdonald of River Glaven, who served as director of public prosecutions from 2003 to 2008, called for explicit limits on the crimes covered by the Bill. Reprieve's director Maya Foa said that although "our intelligence agencies do a vital job in keeping the country safe, ... there must be common sense limits to their agents' activities". Privacy International director and legal office Ilia Siatitsa added that "the public has a right to know what type of criminal acts MI5's policy authorises in the UK. That's why we're fighting them in court. The new Bill does not alleviate these concerns."

The general secretaries of 14 trade unions and a number of campaign groups, including Reprieve, the Pat Finucane Centre, the Orgreave Truth and Justice Campaign, Hillsborough Justice Campaign, and Justice 4 Grenfell, released a joint statement in October 2020 expressing their concerns over the bill.

== Provisions ==
The provisions of the act include:

- Inserting a Section 29B into the Regulation of Investigatory Powers Act 2000 that creates a Criminal Conduct Authorisation (CCA) which allows undercover law enforcement agents or covert sources to break the law in the interests of national security, the wellbeing of the UK's economy, or in order to detect or prevent crime. CCAs must only be used to prevent more serious crimes being committed and when there is no practicable legal path by which the same outcome could be achieved.
- Inserting a Section 29C into the Regulation of Investigatory Powers Act 2000 that implements safeguards in instances where the covert source is under the age of 18. These include extra requirements before a Juvenile Criminal Conduct Authorisation (JCCA) can be issued: a risk assessment must be undertaken, special arrangements for meetings must be made, and there must be exceptional circumstances which mean that the covert source would not come to any harm (Note: Harm here means both physical injury and psychological distress.) and that a JCCA would be in the best interests of the safeguarding of the minor.
- Inserting a Section 29D into the Regulation of Investigatory Powers Act 2000 that implements safeguards in instances where the covert source is a vulnerable adult. This include extra requirements before a CCA can be issued: a risk assessment must be undertaken, the risks of harm identified by the assessment have been sufficiently explained to and understood by the adult, and the need to safeguard the individual has been taken into account.
- Setting out the bodies capable of using undercover agents and CCAs as being:
  - any police force
  - National Crime Agency
  - Serious Fraud Office
  - any of the intelligence agencies
  - HMRC
  - Department of Health and Social Care
  - Home Office
  - Ministry of Justice
  - Competition and Markets Authority
  - Environment Agency
  - Financial Conduct Authority
  - Food Standards Agency
  - Gambling Commission
- Disallowing criminal injuries compensation for conduct authorised under a CCA or a JCCA.
- Making it a requirement of the authorisation or cancellation of a CCA to give notice of the changes to a judicial commissioner.
- Amending the Investigatory Powers Act 2016 to give oversight of the CCA process to the Investigatory Powers Commissioner.
- Consequentially amending the Police Reform Act 2002, the Gambling Act 2005, the Serious Crime Act 2007, the Crime and Courts Act 2013, and the Coronavirus Act 2020 to bring them into line with the provisions of this act.

== Passage through Parliament ==
Rather than opposing the government, the Labour Party ordered its MPs to abstain on the vote. Labour's Shadow Security Minister Conor McGinn said that the Bill "addresses a vital issue" of "provid[ing] a clear lawful framework for the use of human intelligence sources", however also highlighted Labour's concerns of potential of the powers in the Bill to be misused. However, the Socialist Campaign Group of MPs rebelled and voted against the Bill on its second reading. The Bill passed a vote on its second reading in the House of Commons on 5 October 2020 by 182 votes to 20. Of the 20 votes against the bill, 17 were Labour MPs, 2 were Plaid Cymru MPs and one was SDLP MP Colum Eastwood.

On the third reading of the bill, on 15 October 2020, 34 Labour MPs rebelled against the order to abstain, including Shadow Ministers Dan Carden and Margaret Greenwood, as well as five parliamentary private secretaries, who all resigned from their frontbench roles. An amendment to prevent authorisation of serious offences was tabled by Labour leader Keir Starmer, but was defeated by 317 votes to 256. The Bill's third reading passed by 313 votes to 98.

When the Bill reached the House of Lords in January 2021, peers defeated the government in passing two amendments to curtail use of children, and to stop informants participating in the most serious crimes such as murder, torture, and rape. A third amendment by Shami Chakrabarti seeking to prevent immunity for undercover agents was defeated after the Labour leadership chose to abstain. The government argued in response that once a particular crime is explicitly outside the limit of the act, then that crime will be used as a way to "unmask infiltrators" in criminal organisations. Shami Chakrabarti, a member of the House of Lords and the former director of Liberty, pointed out that as under UK law prosecution must be in the public interest, a prosecutor wouldn't charge an agent who was breaking the law in the course of their duty.

Upon the return of the bill to the Commons, the amendments preventing the use of minors and vulnerable people and the participation in serious crimes were defeated in a 363 to 267 vote. An amendment tabled by the Labour frontbench was not put to a vote.

== See also ==
- UK undercover policing relationships scandal
