= Telecommunications Act 1984 =

Act of the Parliament of the United Kingdom

Telecommunications Act 1984 (Note: Section 110(1).)
- Act of Parliament
- Parliament of the United Kingdom
- Long title: An Act to provide for the appointment and functions of a Director General of Telecommunications; to abolish British Telecommunications’ exclusive privilege with respect to telecommunications and to make new provision with respect to the provision of telecommunication services and certain related services; to make provision, in substitution for the Telegraph Acts 1863 to 1916 and Part IV of the Post Office Act 1969, for the matters there dealt with and related matters; to provide for the vesting of property, rights and liabilities of British Telecommunications in a company nominated by the Secretary of State and the subsequent dissolution of British Telecommunications; to make provision with respect to the finances of that company; to amend the Wireless Telegraphy Acts 1949 to 1967, to make further provision for facilitating enforcement of those Acts and otherwise to make provision with respect to wireless telegraphy apparatus and certain related apparatus; to give statutory authority for the payment out of money provided by Parliament of expenses incurred by the Secretary of State in providing a radio interference service; to increase the maximum number of members of British Telecommunications pending its dissolution; and for connected purposes.
- Citation: 1984 c. 12
- Territorial extent: United Kingdom (Note: Section 110(6).)

Dates
- Royal assent: 12 April 1984
- Commencement: various (Note: Section 110(2)–(5.).)
Other legislation
Amends	Telegraph Act 1863; Telegraph Act 1868; Foreign Enlistment Act 1870; Railway and Canal Commission (Abolition) Act 1949; London Government Act 1963; Sewerage (Scotland) Act 1968; Restrictive Trade Practices Act 1976; Unfair Contract Terms Act 1977; Water (Scotland) Act 1980
Repeals/revokes	Telegraph Act 1878; Post Office (Protection) Act 1884; Telegraph (Isle of Man) Act 1889; Telegraph Act 1892; Telegraph (Construction) Act 1908; Telegraph (Arbitration) Act 1909; Telegraph (Construction) Act 1911; Telegraph (Construction) Act 1916
Amended by	Cinemas Act 1985; Interception of Communications Act 1985; Housing (Consequential Provisions) Act 1985; Airports Act 1986; Housing (Scotland) Act 1987; Consumer Protection Act 1987; Income and Corporation Taxes Act 1988; Official Secrets Act 1989; Statute Law (Repeals) Act 1989; Planning (Consequential Provisions) Act 1990; Water Consolidation (Consequential Provisions) Act 1991; Statute Law (Repeals) Act 1993; Planning (Consequential Provisions) (Scotland) Act 1997; Wireless Telegraphy Act 1998; Petroleum Act 1998; Electronic Communications Act 2000; Regulation of Investigatory Powers Act 2000; Postal Services Act 2000; Statute Law (Repeals) Act 2004; Wireless Telegraphy Act 2006; Investigatory Powers Act 2016; Digital Economy Act 2017; Digital Markets, Competition and Consumers Act 2024
Relates to	Telegraph Act 1863; Wireless Telegraphy Act 1949; Wireless Telegraphy (Blind Persons) Act 1955; Wireless Telegraphy Act 1967; Post Office Act 1969

Status: Amended

Text of statute as originally enacted

Text of the Telecommunications Act 1984 as in force today (including any amendments) within the United Kingdom, from legislation.gov.uk.

The Telecommunications Act 1984 (c. 12) is an act of the Parliament of the United Kingdom. The rules for the industry are now contained in the Communications Act 2003.

== Provisions ==
The provisions of the act included the following:

- Privatising British Telecom.
- Establishing Oftel as a telecommunications regulator to protect consumers' interests and market competition.
- Introducing a licensing system for running a telecommunications system or making a connection to another system without a licence. Doing so without a licence became a criminal offence.
- Setting standards for modems according to BABT rules.
- Criminalising indecent, offensive or threatening phone calls.

== Section 94 ==
Section 94 of the act provided a very broad power of government regulation of telecommunications in the interests of national security or relations with foreign governments. It allowed any Secretary of State to give secret directions to Ofcom or any providers of public electronic communications networks. They could be instructed “to do, or not to do” any particular thing specified, and the directions did not automatically expire after a certain period. The Secretary of State was required to lay a copy of every such direction before parliament so as to alert parliament to any possible misuse. However, this did not need to be done if to do so would be against the interests of national security or relations with foreign governments.

It is not known to what extent this power has been used. In reply to a parliamentary question, the security minister James Brokenshire replied: “If the question relates to section 94 of the Telecommunications Act, then I am afraid I can neither confirm nor deny any issues in relation to the utilisation or otherwise of section 94.” The Interception of Communications Commissioner was asked in 2015 by prime minister David Cameron to oversee section 94 directions, but was unable to do so because "there does not appear to be a comprehensive central record of the directions that have been issued by the various Secretaries of State." The commissioner recommended that oversight of section 94 directions is put on a statutory footing and that future legislation requires the use of the section 94 directions to be reported to the commissioner.

Subsequently, on 4 November 2015, the Home Secretary announced that after the September 11 attacks in the U.S., MI5 started collecting bulk telephone communications data on which telephone numbers called each other and when, under a section 94 direction instead of the Regulation of Investigatory Powers Act 2000 which would have brought independent oversight and regulation. This had been kept secret until announced in 2015, without laying the direction before parliament under the against the interests of national security exemption.

Section 94 was later repealed by the Investigatory Powers Act 2016 which introduced new powers for the interception and collection, including bulk collection, of communications by British Intelligence Agencies, authorized by the Investigatory Powers Commission (IPC) it introduces.

== See also ==
- UK public service law
- Telecommunications Act (Canada)
- Telecommunications Act of 1996, United States
- Halsbury's Statutes
- Current Law Statutes Annotated
