= DRIPA =

DRIPA may refer to:

- Data Retention and Investigatory Powers Act 2014
- Declaration on the Rights of Indigenous Peoples Act (British Columbia)
