= Electronic Communications Act 2000 =

Act of the Parliament of the United Kingdom

Electronic Communications Act 2000 (Note: Section 16(1).)
- Act of Parliament
- Parliament of the United Kingdom
- Long title: An Act to make provision to facilitate the use of electronic communications and electronic data storage; to make provision about the modification of licences granted under section 7 of the Telecommunications Act 1984; and for connected purposes.
- Citation: 2000 c. 7
- Territorial extent: United Kingdom

Dates
- Royal assent: 25 May 2000
- Commencement: 25 May 2000 (in part); 25 July 2000 (sections 7, 11 and 12); (Note: Section 16(2)–(4). The Electronic Communications Act 2000 (Commencement No. 1) Order 2000 (SI 2000/1798).)
Other legislation
Amends	Telecommunications Act 1984
Amended by	Regulation of Investigatory Powers Act 2000

Status: Amended

Text of statute as originally enacted

Revised text of statute as amended

The Electronic Communications Act 2000 (c. 7) is an act of the Parliament of the United Kingdom that:

- Had provisions to regulate the provision of cryptographic services in the UK (ss.1-6); and
- Confirms the legal status of electronic signatures (ss.7-10).

The United Kingdom government had come to the conclusion that encryption, encryption services and electronic signatures would be important to e-commerce in the UK.

By 1999, however, only the security services still hankered after key escrow. So a "sunset clause" was put in the bill. The Electronic Communications Act 2000 gave the Home Office the power to create a registration regime for encryption services. This was given a five-year period before it would automatically lapse, which eventually happened in May 2006.

The act implemented the Electronic Signatures Directive 1999, which member states had until 19 July 2001 to bring into local effect. The act was adopted into the Regulation of Investigatory Powers Act 2000.
