= Anthony May (judge) =

British judge (1940–2024)

Sir Anthony Tristram Kenneth May (9 September 1940 – 30 December 2024) was a British judge who served as the President of the Queen's Bench Division.

== Life and career ==
May was born on 9 September 1940. He was educated at Bradfield College and Worcester College, Oxford.

On 1 October 2008, he succeeded Sir Igor Judge as President of the Queen's Bench Division. He was called to the Bar (Inner Temple) in 1967, became a Queen's Counsel in 1979, and a Recorder in 1985. He was appointed to the Queen's Bench Division in 1991, receiving the customary knighthood. In 1997, May was appointed to the Court of Appeal.

May was Vice-President of the Queen's Bench Division from 2002 to 2008, when he was appointed President of the Queen's Bench Division, when the previous president, Sir Igor Judge, became Lord Chief Justice of England and Wales. He was sworn of the Privy Council of the United Kingdom in 1998. May retired from the Queen's Bench Division in July 2011, and was succeeded as its president by Sir John Thomas.

In October 2012, Downing Street announced May would become the Interception of Communications Commissioner beginning on 1 January 2013. In July 2014 he was involved in a serious accident. As a consequence, the former Interception of Communications Commissioner, Sir Paul Kennedy, was re-instated as Interim Commissioner by the Prime Minister. May resumed the commissioner duties on 1 January 2015, and resigned effective 31 July 2015, six months prior to the end of his three-year term. He was succeeded as commissioner by Sir Stanley Burnton.

May died on 30 December 2024, at the age of 84.
