= Collection of Internet Connection Records =

Collection of metadata records of UK Internet users' Internet access patterns

As of March 2021, collection of Internet Connection Records is being secretly trialled by two major British ISPs as part of a technical trial for mass surveillance under the Investigatory Powers Act 2016. The Home Office and National Crime Agency are also participating in the trial.

"Internet Connection Records" is a generic term for metadata records of UK Internet users' Internet access patterns. Data collected may include who they are, what sites they connected to and when, and what quantity of data was transferred, but does not include the data content of the transmissions. While the participants have been kept secret, the existence of the trial has been confirmed by the Investigatory Powers Commissioner’s Office.

== See also ==
- Mass surveillance in the United Kingdom
- NetFlow
- Pen register
- Traffic analysis
