= Interception of Communications Act 1985 =

Act of the Parliament of the United Kingdom

Interception of Communications Act 1985 (Note: Section 12(1).)
- Act of Parliament
- Parliament of the United Kingdom
- Long title: An Act to make new provision for and in connection with the interception of communications sent by post or by means of public telecommunication systems and to amend section 45 of the Telecommunications Act 1984.
- Citation: 1985 c. 56
- Territorial extent: United Kingdom (Note: Section 12(3).)

Dates
- Royal assent: 25 July 1985
- Commencement: 10 April 1986 (Note: Section 12(2). The Interception of Communications Act 1985 (Commencement) Order 1986 (SI 1986/384).)
- Repealed: 2 October 2000 (Note: The Regulation of Investigatory Powers Act 2000 (Commencement No. 1 and Transitional Provisions) Order 2000 (SI 2000/2543).)
Other legislation
Amends	Official Secrets Act 1920; Post Office Act 1953; Post Office Act 1969; House of Commons Disqualification Act 1975; Telecommunications Act 1984
Amended by	Official Secrets Act 1989; Statute Law (Repeals) Act 1993; Scotland Act 1998 (Transfer of Functions to the Scottish Ministers etc. ) Order 1999; Courts and Legal Services Act 1990; Postal Services Act 2000
Repealed by	Regulation of Investigatory Powers Act 2000

Status: Repealed

Text of statute as originally enacted

Revised text of statute as amended

The Interception of Communications Act 1985 (c. 56) was an act of the Parliament of the United Kingdom. It came into operation as of 10 April 1986.

The act created the offence of unlawfully intercepting communications sent by post or by a "public telecommunications system"; those guilty were liable, on conviction, to a fine or up to two years imprisonment. It provided for a system of warrants to permit legal interception, and laid down cases where interception could be done lawfully, stating that having reasonable grounds to believe that the other party consented to interception was a defence.

The act also established a complaints tribunal (which in 2000 was subsumed into the Investigatory Powers Tribunal), and created the post of Interception of Communications Commissioner to review the workings of the act. It amended parts of the Telecommunications Act 1984.

This act has since been repealed by schedule 1 of the Regulation of Investigatory Powers Act 2000.

== See also ==
- Secrecy of correspondence
- Malone v UK
- United Kingdom constitutional law

== Bibliography ==
- Whitaker's Almanack: for the year 1987, complete edition, p. 363. J. Whitaker & Sons, London, 1986
