= Security Service Act 1989 =

Act of the Parliament of the United Kingdom

Security Service Act 1989 (Note: Section 7(1).)
- Act of Parliament
- Parliament of the United Kingdom
- Long title: An Act to place the Security Service on a statutory basis; to enable certain actions to be taken on the authority of warrants issued by the Secretary of State, with provision for the issue of such warrants to be kept under review by a Commissioner; to establish a procedure for the investigation by a Tribunal or, in some cases, by the Commissioner of complaints about the Service; and for connected purposes.
- Citation: 1989 c. 5
- Introduced by: Douglas Hurd
- Territorial extent: United Kingdom (Note: Section 7(3).)

Dates
- Royal assent: 27 April 1989
- Commencement: 18 December 1989 (Note: Section 7(2). The Security Service Act 1989 (Commencement) Order 1989.)
Other legislation
Amended by	Intelligence Services Act 1994; Regulation of Investigatory Powers Act 2000; Serious Organised Crime and Police Act 2005; Crime and Courts Act 2013; Investigatory Powers Act 2016
Relates to	Intelligence Services Act 1994; Security Service Act 1996

Status: Amended

Text of statute as originally enacted

Revised text of statute as amended

Text of the Security Service Act 1989 as in force today (including any amendments) within the United Kingdom, from legislation.gov.uk.

The Security Service Act 1989 (c. 5) is an act of the Parliament of the United Kingdom. The act established a statutory basis of the UK Security Service (MI5) for the first time. Prior to the act, successive UK governments had denied the existence of MI5, despite its operation since 1909. The act begins, "There shall continue to be a Security Service .."

The first section defines the function of the service as:

the protection of national security and, in particular, its protection against threats from espionage, terrorism and sabotage, from the activities of agents of foreign powers and from actions intended to overthrow or undermine parliamentary democracy by political, industrial or violent means.

In the next paragraph it adds the further function, "to safeguard the economic well-being of the United Kingdom against threats posed by the actions or intentions of persons outside the British Islands."

The act was amended by the Security Service Act 1996 to include supporting the police and other law enforcement agencies in the prevention and detection of serious crime.

== See also ==
- David Maxwell Fyfe, 1st Earl of Kilmuir
- Spycatcher
