= Judith Farbey =

British judge (born 1965)

The Honourable Mrs Justice Farbey
- Royal coat of arms of the United Kingdom

High Court Judge King's Bench Division
- Incumbent
- Assumed office 1 October 2018
- Monarch: Charles III

Judicial Member of the Investigatory Powers Tribunal
- Incumbent
- Assumed office 7 August 2023

Personal details
- Born: 21 October 1965 (age 60) London, England
- Education: City University; Magdalen College, Oxford

Dame Judith Sarah Farbey, DBE (born 21 October 1965) is a British High Court judge and the Vice President of the Investigatory Powers Tribunal.

Farbey was born in London and attended university at Magdalen College, Oxford, completing a BA in 1989. After her undergraduate studies, she completed a graduate diploma in law at City University in 1991.

Following her time at City, she was called to the bar at Middle Temple in 1992, practising from Doughty Street Chambers. She took silk in 2011 and served as deputy judge of the Upper Tribunal (Administrative Appeals Chamber) from 2014 to 2018 and served as a recorder from 2016 to 2018. She was a member of the Bar Standards Board from 2016 to 2018. In addition to practice, she jointly authored Law of Habeas Corpus in 2011.

On 1 October 2018, Farbey was appointed a judge of the High Court and assigned to the Queen's Bench Division. She received the customary damehood in the same year. She was President of the Upper Tribunal (Administrative Appeals Chamber) from 2019 to 2022. In 2023 she was appointed as a Judicial Member of the Investigatory Powers Tribunal, and in May 2026 she was appointed Vice President of the Tribunal.

In 2011, she married Prabhat Vaze.
