= Intelligence Services Commissioner =

The intelligence services commissioner, was a regulatory official in the United Kingdom appointed under Section 59 of the Regulation of Investigatory Powers Act 2000. They are tasked with reviewing actions and warrants taken by the secretary of state under the Intelligence Services Act 1994 and the activities of British intelligence only in regard to the use of surveillance, covert human intelligence sources (i.e. agents) and interception of communications by MI5, MI6, and GCHQ assuming such actions and activities are not being reviewed by the interception of communications commissioner.

Until January 2011, the commissioner was Sir Peter Gibson. In January 2011, the prime minister David Cameron appointed Sir Mark Waller as the intelligence services commissioner, who continued in his post until retirement at the end of 2016. On 20 September 2016 Prime Minister Theresa May appointed Sir John Goldring to the office, effective 1 January 2017.

On 1 September 2017 the offices of intelligence services, surveillance, and interception of communications were combined into the Investigatory Powers Commissioner's Office.

== See also ==
- Investigatory Powers Tribunal
