= Source (intelligence) =

A source or subsource in intelligence is typically a confidential provider of non open-source intelligence. In espionage, this includes "assets" who are personally developed.
