= Intelligence Services Act 1994 =

Act of the Parliament of the United Kingdom

Intelligence Services Act 1994 (Note: Section 12(1).)
- Act of Parliament
- Parliament of the United Kingdom
- Long title: An Act to make provision about the Secret Intelligence Service and the Government Communications Headquarters, including provision for the issue of warrants and authorisations enabling certain actions to be taken and for the issue of such warrants and authorisations to be kept under review; to make further provision about warrants issued on applications by the Security Service; to establish a procedure for the investigation of complaints about the Secret Intelligence Service and the Government Communications Headquarters; to make provision for the establishment of an Intelligence and Security Committee to scrutinise all three of those bodies; and for connected purposes.
- Citation: 1994 c. 13
- Territorial extent: United Kingdom (Note: Section 12(3).)

Dates
- Royal assent: 26 May 1994
- Commencement: 2 November 1994: §12(4); 15 December 1994 (rest of act); (Note: Section 12(2). The The Intelligence Services Act 1994 (Commencement) Order 1994 .)
Other legislation
Amends	House of Commons Disqualification Act 1975; Northern Ireland Assembly Disqualification Act 1975; Official Secrets Act 1989; Security Service Act 1989
Amended by	Security Service Act 1996; Scotland Act 1998 (Transfer of Functions to the Scottish Ministers etc. ) Order 1999; Regulation of Investigatory Powers Act 2000; Anti-terrorism, Crime and Security Act 2001; Terrorism Act 2006; Wireless Telegraphy Act 2006; Justice and Security Act 2013; Investigatory Powers Act 2016
Relates to	Security Service Act 1989; Human Rights Act 1998

Status: Amended

Text of statute as originally enacted

Text of the Intelligence Services Act 1994 as in force today (including any amendments) within the United Kingdom, from legislation.gov.uk.

The Intelligence Services Act 1994 (c. 13) is an act of the Parliament of the United Kingdom.

The act, sometimes abbreviated as ISA, is introduced by the long title which states:

An Act to make provision about the Secret Intelligence Service and the Government Communications Headquarters, including provision for the issue of warrants and authorisations enabling certain actions to be taken and for the issue of such warrants and authorisations to be kept under review; to make further provision about warrants issued on applications by the Security Service; to establish a procedure for the investigation of complaints about the Secret Intelligence Service and the Government Communications Headquarters; to make provision for the establishment of an Intelligence and Security Committee to scrutinise all three of those bodies; and for connected purposes.

The act placed SIS and GCHQ on a statutory footing for the first time. The role of SIS was defined as: "to obtain and provide information relating to the actions or intentions of persons outside the British Islands; and to perform other tasks relating to the actions or intentions of such persons". The act provided for a tribunal to investigate complaints and an oversight committee (the Intelligence and Security Committee of Parliament) composed of nine MPs reporting to the Prime Minister.

The act also gives the Secretary of State for Foreign and Commonwealth Affairs the power to grant immunity from British prosecution to SIS personnel when they engage in any acts while on operations abroad that would be illegal under British law, such as murder.

== Purpose ==
Section 1 of the act provides authority for the Secret Intelligence Service (MI6) to conduct intelligence activities, while Section 3 provides the similar basis for the Government Communications Headquarters (GCHQ):

in the interests of national security, with particular reference to the defence and foreign policies of His Majesty's government in the United Kingdom; or in the interests of the economic wellbeing of the UK; or in the support of the prevention or detection of serious crime

The phrase "interests of the economic wellbeing of the UK" has been criticised by European governments as appearing to authorise industrial espionage.

== Regulation ==
The activities of the intelligence agencies of the United Kingdom are regulated by the Regulation of Investigatory Powers Act 2000 (RIPA) which incorporates by reference the Human Rights Act 1998.

== Use ==
Disclosed by Edward Snowden in 2013: Acting under the authority granted by the act British intelligence agencies have monitored foreign leaders and diplomats at international conferences such as meetings of the G20. The information gathered has been used to brief senior British participants during the conferences.

Disclosed by Edward Snowden in 2013: Under warrants which authorise intercepting internet traffic by tapping into fibre optic cables the Tempora program gathers all traffic flowing through the cables at the intercept point and then, using search algorithms which select material which conforms to the purposes authorised by the warrants, logs promising results for further examination. In addition to "interests of the economic wellbeing of the UK", the purposes include "intelligence on the political intentions of foreign governments; military postures of foreign countries; terrorism, international drug trafficking and fraud."

== See also ==
- Security Service Act 1989, which covers the functions of MI5.
