= Investigatory Powers Tribunal =

State surveillance tribunal in the United Kingdom

- Royal coat of arms of the United Kingdom as used in England and Wales
- Established: 2000
- Jurisdiction: United Kingdom
- Authorised by: Regulation of Investigatory Powers Act 2000
- Appeals to: Court of Appeal of England and Wales (in England and Wales) Court of Session (in Scotland)
- Website: investigatorypowerstribunal.org.uk

President
- Currently: Lady Carmichael
- Since: 1 November 2025

Vice President
- Currently: Dame Judith Sarah Farbey
- Since: 11 May 2026

The Investigatory Powers Tribunal (IPT) is a first-instance tribunal and superior court of record in the United Kingdom. It is primarily an inquisitorial court.

It hears complaints about surveillance by public bodies, primarily the intelligence services. It does not hear complaints about surveillance by private bodies.

It is a part of the Home Office but operates independently. It is also separate from the administration of the rest of the UK tribunals system.

== History ==
Original logo of the IPT

The IPT was established by the Regulation of Investigatory Powers Act 2000 (RIPA 2000), replacing the Interception of Communications Tribunal, the Security Service Tribunal, and the Intelligence Services Tribunal.

Its powers were amended by the Investigatory Powers Act 2016 (IPA 2016) to, among other things, introduce appeals to higher courts.

== Jurisdiction ==
The IPT is a UK-wide tribunal. This means it operates in all three legal jurisdictions within the UK, taking into account the differences in law between them.

=== Under the RIPA 2000 ===
The IPT considers complaints about the conduct any organisation with powers under RIPA, particularly with regards to surveillance. These include:

- Police forces
- The Security Service (MI5)
- The Secret Intelligence Service (MI6)
- Government Communications Headquarters (GCHQ)
- Other public authorities

=== Under the HRA 1998 ===
Section 65 of the RIPA 2000 empowers the IPT to consider proceedings under the Human Rights Act 1998, to enforce Article 13 of the European Convention on Human Rights.

It has exclusive jurisdiction over HRA complaints against any of the intelligence services. Other claims under the HRA can only be considered by the IPT if it regards conduct by or on behalf of:

- The British Armed Forces
- Police forces
- The Police Investigations and Review Commissioner
- The National Crime Agency
- The Competition and Markets Authority
- HM Revenue and Customs

Unless the Tribunal has exclusive jurisdiction, claims against public authorities for the use of covert investigatory powers can also be brought in the ordinary courts. The Tribunal does, however, have the power to investigate a complaint made to it which ordinary courts do not possess.

== Proceedings ==
=== Making a complaint ===
There are two types of complaint possible:

- Human rights claims - where the complainant feels the HRA 1998 has been violated
- Unlawful interference claims - where the complainant feels public authorities have unlawfully interfered in their lives using covert techniques

Complaints may be dealt with on paper or by oral hearing, at the IPT's discretion. The vast majority of decisions are dealt on paper only. This means only a small percentage of cases submitted to the Tribunal proceed to a hearing in court. The Tribunal is under no duty to hold a hearing.

=== Investigation and hearings ===
Unlike most courts in the UK, which use an adversarial system, the IPT mostly uses an inquisitorial system, similar to that of Coroner's Courts, Sheriff Courts under fatal accident inquiry proceedings, or many courts in continental Europe. This is necessary because of the confidentiality of the evidence being considered.

The Counsel to the Tribunal assists the IPT in closed sessions to ensure that points of law or other matters that may have been advanced by the complainants are fully considered.

However, the IPT may also facilitate adversarial open sessions by assuming facts, allowing for advocates to debate over points of law without disclosing confidential evidence. Since 2003, it has tried to sit in public where possible.

It may make interim orders to prevent activities from continuing when investigations are taking place.

=== Judgments ===
==== Possible outcomes ====
The IPT has two outcomes that 'favour' a party:

- It finds in favour of the complainant
- It finds 'no determination', where either no conduct has taken place or no illegal conduct has taken place by the respondent - in effect this is finding in favour of the respondent

There are also a number of inconclusive outcomes, which make up the vast majority of outcomes:

- It finds the complaint is frivolous or vexatious
- It finds the complaint is out of time
- It dismisses or strikes out the complaint (eg it has not been submitted properly)
- The complaint is withdrawn by the complainant

==== Remedies ====
The IPT has powers of the High Court when making judgments. As such, when finding in favour of the complainant it can:

- Order activities to cease
- Order material to be destroyed
- Quash authorisations
- Award compensation

It does not normally award legal costs to either party. It also does not order remedies in any other outcome.

=== Independence ===
The Tribunal is a judicial body, entirely independent of Parliament and HM Government. Its judicial independence is enshrined in law by the Constitutional Reform Act 2005. No organisation can intervene in the IPT's investigations or influence its decisions.

The IPT is administered separately from the rest of the UK tribunal system, and is not under the leadership of the Senior President of Tribunals. This is both because it deals primarily with issues of national security and because its inquisitorial system differs from most tribunals.

It exempt from the Freedom of Information Act 2000.

=== Statistics ===
The vast majority of cases have an outcome where neither side 'wins' as such. In 2021:

- No cases were found in favour of the complainant
- 13% of cases were found 'no determination'
- 70% of cases were found frivolous or vexatious
- 6% of cases were found out of jurisdiction
- 4% of cases did not proceed in time

==== Outcomes in favour of one side ====
| Year | Cases decided | Percentage found 'no determination' | Percentage found in favour of complainant | Source |
|---|---|---|---|---|
| 2012-2016 | 200 (on average per year) | 28.9% | 5% | |
| 2017 | 201 | 10% | 4% | |
| 2018 | 207 | 22% | 1% | |
| 2019 | 249 | 14% | 1% | |
| 2020 | 211 | 18% | None | |
| 2021 | 372 | 13% | None | |

== Appeals ==
The RIPA did not originally provide an avenue for appeal, other than to take the case to the European Court of Human Rights.

However, this was amended by the Investigatory Powers Act 2016 to introduce appeals to:

- The Court of Appeal of England and Wales when in England and Wales or Northern Ireland
- The Inner House of the Court of Session when in Scotland

This gives it senior court status, equivalent to for example the Crown Court or the Upper Tribunal.

The IPA 2016 allows for the Secretary of State for Northern Ireland, with the permission of the Northern Ireland Assembly, to use the Court of Appeal of Northern Ireland instead of its English equivalent when in Northern Ireland. However, as of 2021 this has not happened.

=== Judicial Review ===
The Supreme Court found in R (Privacy International) v Investigatory Powers Tribunal that errors in law made by the court may be subject to judicial review. As such, decisions may be reviewed by:

- The High Court of Justice when in England and Wales
- The Outer House of the Court of Session when in Scotland
- The High Court of Northern Ireland when in Northern Ireland

== People ==
=== Representation ===
Parties may choose to be represented by a barrister, advocate (in Scotland), or solicitor, but these are not required. It is common for complainants to represent themselves.

=== Counsel to the Tribunal ===
Counsel to the Tribunal are normally temporary appointments to assist the Tribunal's consideration of a complaint. This can be because:

- The complainant is not legally represented
- Evidence cannot be shown to the complainant

The CTT will ensure that all relevant arguments are put before the Tribunal, as well as organising and summarising evidence to be shown to the complainant. The role is somewhat comparable to the role of the procurator fiscal in Sheriff Court fatal accident inquiries.

=== Judiciary ===
The IPT's judiciary are known as Tribunal Members. They are appointed from experienced lawyers and judiciary.

The Tribunal President is always a Lord Justice of Appeal. The Vice-President is always a Senator of the College of Justice, as must be one other Member. There must also be a Member from Northern Ireland.

As of 2023, the Tribunal Members are:

- Lord Justice Singh - President
- Lord Boyd of Duncansby - Vice-President
- Lady Carmichael - 2nd Scottish Member
- Lieven J
- Chamberlain J
- Judge Rupert Jones
- Charles Flint KC
- Stephen Shaw KC - Northern Irish Member
- Annabel Darlow KC
- Francesca Del Mese

Members are usually appointed for a term of five years, after which they are eligible for reappointment.

=== Secretariat ===
The Tribunal Members are assisted in their work by a Secretariat, who provide administrative support for the Tribunal including investigating complaints as directed by a Tribunal Member.

The Secretariat comprises a Head of Secretariat who is responsible for the effective and efficient management of processes, a Tribunal Secretary, Deputy Tribunal Secretary, a Business Manager and a case-working team.

== Notable cases ==
=== Snowden disclosures ===
In The National Council of Civil Liberties et al v Secretary of State for Foreign and Commonwealth Affairs, following the global surveillance disclosures by Edward Snowden in 2013, the UK government submitted documents to the IPT which showed for the first time that its intelligence services could access raw material collected in bulk by the National Security Agency (NSA), and other foreign spy agencies, without a warrant. This appeared to contradict assurances given in July 2013 by the Parliamentary Intelligence and Security Committee which stated that in all cases in which GCHQ obtained intelligence from the US a warrant was signed by a minister.

=== Surveillance of lawyer-client communication ===
On 6 November 2014, official documents disclosed to the IPT by the intelligence agencies revealed that their guidance policies allowed staff to access confidential communications between lawyers and their clients. This privileged relationship is usually strictly protected under British law, and leading campaigners said the disclosures had "troubling implications for the whole British justice system".

The release of the documents resulted from a claim brought on behalf of two Libyan men who had sued the British government for alleged complicity in their detention and subsequent rendition to the Libyan authorities. The British government refused to make a full statement concerning the revelations contained in the documents, saying only that it did not comment on ongoing legal proceedings.

The IPT initially ruled in December 2014 that GCHQ did not breach the ECHR, and that its activities were compliant with Articles 8 ('right to privacy') and 10 ('freedom of expression').

However, in February 2015, the tribunal refined its earlier judgement and ruled that aspects of the data-sharing arrangement that allowed UK Intelligence services to request data from the US surveillance programmes Prism and Upstream did contravene the ECHR and as such were illegal between at least 2007, when Prism was introduced, and 2014, when two paragraphs of additional information, providing details about the procedures and safeguards, were disclosed to the public in December 2014.

It also ruled that the legislative framework in the United Kingdom does not permit mass surveillance and that while GCHQ collects and analyses data in bulk, it does not practice mass surveillance. This complemented independent reports by the Interception of Communications Commissioner, and a special report made by the Intelligence and Security Committee of Parliament.

=== Poole Borough Council ===
Paton v Poole Borough Council was a high-profile case of a family who were placed under surveillance by Poole Borough Council in order to investigate claims that the family were not living in the school catchment area which they claimed. The family was applying to send a child to Liliput First School, which was over-subscribed at the time. Believing that the family lived elsewhere, PBC used its powers under RIPA 2000 to 'spy on her family 21 times'. The IPT ruled that the use of covert surveillance by the council was not an appropriate use of these powers.

=== Parliamentary surveillance ===
In 2015, three parliamentarians took a case to the IPT that the Wilson Doctrine, that parliamentarians' communications should not be tapped, was being broken.

The IPT would find that the Wilson Doctrine was not enforceable in law and does not impose any legal restraints on the intelligence agencies. It stated MPs have the same level of legal protection as the general public when it comes to interception of their communications, and that only lawyers and journalists have more protection due to human rights law.

Subsequently, the Prime Minister and the Home Secretary said in Parliament that the protection of MPs communications from being intercepted still applies but does not extend to a blanket ban on surveillance.

Section 26 of the Investigatory Powers Act 2016 partly enshrined the Wilson Doctrine in statute law.

== Criticism ==
In 2014, the IPT was criticised by The Guardian newspaper for its association with the Home Office, which stated the two were based within the same building. The paper also criticised the low number of cases the IPT had upheld - then 10 of the 1500 complaints it had received.

== See also ==
- Intelligence Services Commissioner
- Investigatory Powers Act 2016
- Mass surveillance in the United Kingdom
- United States Foreign Intelligence Surveillance Court
