= Justice and Security Act 2013 =

Act of the Parliament of the United Kingdom

Justice and Security Act 2013 (Note: Section 20(7).)
- Act of Parliament
- Parliament of the United Kingdom
- Long title: An Act to provide for oversight of the Security Service, the Secret Intelligence Service, the Government Communications Headquarters and other activities relating to intelligence or security matters; to make provision about closed material procedure in relation to certain civil proceedings; to prevent the making of certain court orders for the disclosure of sensitive information; and for connected purposes.
- Citation: 2013 c. 18
- Introduced by: Kenneth Clarke (Commons); Lord Wallace of Tankerness (Lords)
- Territorial extent: United Kingdom (Note: Section 20(3)–(6).)

Dates
- Royal assent: 25 April 2013
- Commencement: Various (Note: Section 20(1)–(2).)
Other legislation
| Amends | Judicature (Northern Ireland) Act 1978; Senior Courts Act 1981; Intelligence Services Act 1994; Special Immigration Appeals Commission Act 1997; Race Relations (Northern Ireland) Order 1997; Data Protection Act 1998; Northern Ireland Act 1998; Regulation of Investigatory Powers Act 2000; Freedom of Information Act 2000; Equality Act 2006; Equality Act 2010 |
| Amended by | Investigatory Powers Act 2016; Secretaries of State for Energy Security and Net Zero, for Science, Innovation and Technology, for Business and Trade, and for Culture, Media and Sport and the Transfer of Functions (National Security and Investment Act 2021 etc) Order 2023 |

Status: Amended

History of passage through Parliament

Text of statute as originally enacted

Revised text of statute as amended

The Justice and Security Act 2013 (c. 18) is an act of the Parliament of the United Kingdom, firstly to provide for oversight of the Security Service (MI5), the Secret Intelligence Service (MI6), the Government Communications Headquarters (GCHQ), and other parts of the UK intelligence community, on intelligence or security matters; secondly to provide for the establishment of closed material procedures (CMP) in relation to certain civil proceedings; and thirdly to prevent the making of court orders for the disclosure of what the government deems to be sensitive information.

The bill was published as a Justice and Security green paper on 3 October 2011. It was presented to Parliament on 28 November 2012. It completed its House of Lords Committee stage on 7 February 2013. It had its second reading debate on 18 December 2012, and its third reading and report stage on 7 March 2013.

== Justice and Security green paper ==
On 3 October 2011, Kenneth Clarke the then Justice Secretary at the Ministry of Justice representing the government, published a Justice and Security green paper proposing to make secret procedures available in all types of civil proceedings. The green paper proposed that, even when the Government is itself involved in proceedings, it should have the power to decide for itself whether to invoke the secret procedure, with only a very limited review by the court. Most secret procedures to date had been confined to a few specialist types of cases, usually immigration, cases involving issues of national security, and control order proceedings involving terror suspects. With the proposals in the green paper, this power would be used only in cases involving national security, but also in any other case where the government decides that the disclosure of sensitive material would be likely to result in 'harm to the public interest'. The controversial green paper became the Justice and Security Bill 2012–13, and was sponsored through Parliament by Kenneth Clarke (in the House of Commons) and by Lord Wallace of Tankerness (in the House of Lords) before becoming the Justice and Security Act 2013 on 25 April 2013.

=== Closed material procedures ===
If you are before a court, whether in criminal or civil proceedings, you can see and challenge the other side's evidence. In a civil case the judge will give detailed reasons for their decisions, and the whole process will be subject to scrutiny by the public and press. Closed materials are never shown to the other party, or his lawyers, who are excluded from parts, if not all of the hearing.

The government considered that there are some cases where the court can decide the case, without giving the other party any details of the case against him. Those that pushed for this radical change to the British justice system were concerned about the dangers arising from the disclosure of sensitive material, and also the dangers of non-disclosure of materials involving government accountability.

=== Public interest immunity ===
The British justice system has a set of rules called public-interest immunity (PII), which is a principle of English common law under which the English courts can grant a court order allowing one litigant to refrain from disclosing evidence to the other litigants where disclosure would be damaging to the public interest. At the extreme, public interest immunity rules may mean that a case cannot be heard at all. This is an exception to the usual rule that all parties in litigation must disclose any evidence that is relevant to the proceedings. In making a PII order, the court has to balance the public interest in the administration of justice (which demands that relevant material is available to the parties to litigation) and the public interest in maintaining the confidentiality of certain documents whose disclosure would be damaging.

It is of note that fewer PII certificates have been issued in recent years. For example, MI6 have not succeeded in obtaining a PII certificate since the 1995 Tomlinson case, and have thus been subject to court scrutiny for investigations such as the inquest into the death of the Princess of Wales. In Crown Prosecution Service v Paul Burrell [2002] a public interest immunity certificate allowed the prosecution to apply to the judge for a ruling that disclosure of certain information would be harmful to the public interest and should not be made public.

=== Special advocates ===
A submission to government ministers, from 57 of the 69 current special advocates, stated CMPs "represent a departure from the foundational principle of natural justice, that all parties are entitled to see and challenge all evidence relied upon before the court, and to combat that evidence by calling evidence of their own". The submission stated that "Government ministers should not be endowed with discretionary powers to extend unfairness and lack of transparency to any proceedings to which they are themselves party". Further warning, "it would leave Britain with more draconian rules than any other country in the world, more suited to despotic regimes such as Iran and North Korea".

Barrister Martin Chamberlain, who has worked in secret courts since 2003, describes a system of justice worthy of Franz Kafka, describing Josef K's fictional ordeal in The Trial, as closed material procedures in Britain in the 21st century.

"As a special advocate, you are able to see and hear both the 'open' and 'closed' evidence. But often, the government witness will refuse to answer particular questions in open court, and the issue will have to be pursued by the special advocate in a closed hearing. But, after seeing the closed material, I am prohibited from speaking to my client. So I will never know if he had an alibi or an innocent explanation and nor will the court".

== Opposition ==
=== Right to a fair trial ===
The right to a fair trial has been defined in numerous regional and international human rights instruments. It is one of the most extensive human rights and all international human rights instruments enshrine it in more than one article. The right to a fair trial is one of the most litigated human rights and substantial case law has been established on the interpretation of this human right. Despite variations in wording and placement of the various fair trial rights, international human rights instruments define the right to a fair trial in broadly the same terms. The aim of the right is to ensure the proper administration of justice. As a minimum the right to fair trial includes the following fair trial rights in civil and criminal proceedings:

- the right to be heard by a competent, independent and impartial tribunal
- the right to a public hearing
- the right to be heard within a reasonable time
- the right to counsel
- the right to interpretation

There are several concerns that the bill makes no provision whatsoever for recording and reporting on the use of CMPs, nor for any notice to be provided for CMPs, nor is there any provision for closed judgments or materials to be reviewed, or opened when secrecy is no longer required. Also that defendants will not be allowed to be present, or know or challenge the case against them, and must be represented by a security-cleared special advocate, rather than their own lawyer. The government's commitment to open justice and transparency has not been addressed, in spite of the Joint Committee on Human Rights 24th Report (Ch 6) that identified democratic accountability and media freedom as "the missing issue in the Green Paper". The bill establishes an unnecessary, unjustifiable regime of secrecy, with the potential to become widespread in cases already beset by secrecy, and in which CMPs would not result in fairer trials. The bill stops the press and public knowing about important matters of public interest. The scope of amendments to the bill fall well below what the Joint Committee on Human Rights recommended.

The Joint Committee on Human Rights also said "in all the evidence it had received, apart from that of the Government, the proposals indicate a 'radical departure' from ancient principles of 'open justice and fairness'". The committee criticised Home Secretary Theresa May for refusing to allow even special advocates to have access to information so they could assess whether secret trials were necessary.

==== Liberal Democrats ====
The issue of CMPs is controversial within the Liberal Democrats, the junior party in the coalition government. A motion put forward by Jo Shaw, former parliamentary candidate for Holborn and St Pancras, to the party's 2012 autumn conference passed "overwhelmingly" and called upon its MPs to vote against Part 2 of the bill relating to CMPs. Regardless, only seven of the party's then fifty-six MPs voted against the bill's third reading on 4 March 2013, leading to an emergency motion being filed for the party's spring conference the following weekend. The motion was coupled with Shaw's resignation from the party, and was again passed "overwhelmingly". Along with Shaw, human rights lawyers Dinah Rose and Philippe Sands, and copyright reform activist Cory Doctorow publicly announced their resignations of their party memberships following the bill's vote.

==== European Convention on Human Rights ====
Article 6 of the European Convention on Human Rights protects the right to a fair trial, an 'implied' right stemming from the 'equality of arms', that hearings should be adversarial and both parties should have access to the same evidence and witnesses. The European Court of Human Rights has held that Article 6 (especially the 'implied' rights) is not an absolute right and that measures restricting the rights of the defense so as to safeguard an important public interest are lawful if "strictly necessary". On 22 November 2012, by margins of over 100 votes, peers voted to remove ministers' exclusive right to apply for secret hearings, as a "tilting of the balance away from the free individual towards the interest of the state", and gave judges the discretion to decide on secret court hearings. Lord Wallace of Tankerness, representing the Government in rejecting the Lords concerns said that "at present people assumed the Government settled controversial cases because there had been 'some wrongdoing' whereas in fact it was often that relevant material could not be put before the court".

==== Law Society of England and Wales ====
The Law Society has repeatedly stated opposition to the use of CMPs to ordinary civil proceedings. The society contends the government has failed to present a national security case for jeopardising these fundamental constitutional principles. The society re-stated this position in a letter jointly signed with General Council of the Bar, to the Minister Without Portfolio, Kenneth Clarke MP: "Closed Material Procedures depart from an essential principle that all parties are entitled to see and challenge all of the evidence relied upon before the court, and to combat that evidence by evidence of their own. In addition, they undermine the principle that public justice should be dispensed in public, and will weaken fair trial guarantees of equality of arms, which are essential elements of the rule of law".

==== International concerns ====
On 28 February 2013, a group of international organisations, including the American Civil Liberties Union and similar bodies from Ireland, Canada, South Africa, Argentina, Egypt and Hungary, also expressed similar concerns about the controversial British 'Justice and Security legislation', warning in a joint statement: "If the UK Parliament passes this proposal into law it will be a huge setback for those of us fighting to secure truth and fairness from our own governments and within our own justice systems across the world."

== See also ==
- Defamation Act 2013
