= Regulation of Investigatory Powers Act 2000 =

Act of the Parliament of the United Kingdom

Regulation of Investigatory Powers Act 2000 (Note: Section 83(1).)
- Act of Parliament
- Parliament of the United Kingdom
- Long title: Click "show" An Act to make provision for and about the interception of communications, the acquisition and disclosure of data relating to communications, the carrying out of surveillance, the use of covert human intelligence sources and the acquisition of the means by which electronic data protected by encryption or passwords may be decrypted or accessed; to provide for Commissioners and a tribunal with functions and jurisdiction in relation to those matters, to entries on and interferences with property or with wireless telegraphy and to the carrying out of their functions by the Security Service, the Secret Intelligence Service and the Government Communications Headquarters; and for connected purposes.
- Citation: 2000 c. 23
- Territorial extent: United Kingdom (Note: Section 83(3).)

Dates
- Royal assent: 28 July 2000
- Commencement: Various (Note: Section 83(2).)
Other legislation
Amends	Wireless Telegraphy Act 1949; Post Office Act 1953; Post Office Act 1969; House of Commons Disqualification Act 1975; Northern Ireland Assembly Disqualification Act 1975; Telecommunications Act 1984; Interception of Communications Act 1985; Security Service Act 1989; Official Secrets Act 1989; Courts and Legal Services Act 1990; Intelligence Services Act 1994; Criminal Procedure and Investigations Act 1996; Police Act 1997; Special Immigration Appeals Commission Act 1997; Crime and Disorder Act 1998; Northern Ireland Act 1998; Electronic Communications Act 2000; Financial Services and Markets Act 2000; Terrorism Act 2000
Repeals/revokes	Interception of Communications Act 1985
Amended by	Justice (Northern Ireland) Act 2002; Crime (International Co-operation) Act 2003; Prevention of Terrorism Act 2005; Terrorism Act 2006; Wireless Telegraphy Act 2006; Identity Cards Act 2006; National Health Service (Consequential Provisions) Act 2006; Counter-Terrorism Act 2008; Constitutional Reform and Governance Act 2010; Terrorist Asset-Freezing etc. Act 2010; Identity Documents Act 2010; Postal Services Act 2011; Terrorism Prevention and Investigation Measures Act 2011; Justice and Security Act 2013; Data Retention and Investigatory Powers Act 2014; Investigatory Powers Act 2016; Policing and Crime Act 2017; Sanctions and Anti-Money Laundering Act 2018; Covert Human Intelligence Sources (Criminal Conduct) Act 2021; Employment Rights Act 2025

Status: Amended

Text of statute as originally enacted

Revised text of statute as amended

The Regulation of Investigatory Powers Act 2000 (c. 23) (RIPA) is an act of the Parliament of the United Kingdom, regulating the powers of public bodies to carry out surveillance and investigation, and covering the interception of communications. It was introduced by the Tony Blair Labour government ostensibly to take account of technological change such as the growth of the Internet and strong encryption.

The Regulation of Investigatory Powers Bill was introduced in the House of Commons on 9 February 2000 and completed its parliamentary passage on 26 July.

Following a public consultation and Parliamentary debate, Parliament approved new additions in December 2003, April 2005, July 2006 and February 2010. A draft bill was put before Parliament during 4 November 2015.

== Summary ==
RIPA regulates the manner in which certain public bodies may conduct surveillance and access a person's electronic communications. The Act:

- enables certain public bodies to demand that an Internet service provider (ISP) provide access to a customer's communications in secret;
- enables mass surveillance of communications in transit;
- enables certain public bodies to demand ISPs fit equipment to facilitate surveillance;
- enables certain public bodies to demand that someone hand over keys to protected information;
- allows certain public bodies to monitor people's Internet activities;
- prevents the existence of interception warrants and any data collected with them from being revealed in court.

== Powers ==
Type	Typical use	Reasons for use	Type of public authority permitted to use	Level of authorisation required
Interception of a communication	Wire taps and reading post	In the interests of national security, for the purpose of preventing or detecting serious crime and for the purpose of safeguarding the economic well-being of the United Kingdom	Defence Intelligence, GCHQ, HM Revenue and Customs, Border Force, Secret Intelligence Service, Security Service and territorial police forces	Warrant from Home Secretary or Cabinet Secretary for Justice AND a Judicial Commissioner
Use of communications data	Information about a communication, but not the content of that communication (phone numbers, subscriber details)	In the interests of national security, for the purpose of preventing or detecting crime or of preventing disorder, in the interests of the economic well-being of the United Kingdom, in the interests of public safety, for the purpose of protecting public health, for the purpose of assessing or collecting any tax, duty, levy or other imposition, contribution or charge payable to a government department and for the purpose, in an emergency, of preventing death or injury or any damage to a person's physical or mental health, or of any injury or damage to a person's physical or mental health.	As listed below	Senior member of that authority
Directed surveillance	Following people	In the interests of national security, for the purpose of preventing or detecting crime or of preventing disorder, in the interests of the economic well-being of the United Kingdom, in the interests of public safety, for the purpose of protecting public health and for the purpose of assessing or collecting any tax, duty, levy or other imposition, contribution or charge payable to a government department.	As listed below	Senior member of that authority
Covert human intelligence sources	Informers; undercover officers	In the interests of national security, for the purpose of preventing or detecting crime or of preventing disorder, in the interests of the economic well-being of the United Kingdom, in the interests of public safety, for the purpose of protecting public health and for the purpose of assessing or collecting any tax, duty, levy or other imposition, contribution or charge payable to a government department.	As listed above	Senior member of that authority
Intrusive surveillance	Bugging houses/vehicles	In the interests of national security, for the purpose of preventing or detecting serious crime and in the interests of the economic well-being of the United Kingdom.	GCHQ, Secret Intelligence Service, Security Service, Ministry of Defence, armed forces, His Majesty's Prison Service or Northern Ireland Prison Service.	Authorisation from Home Secretary or Cabinet Secretary for Justice
Intrusive surveillance	Bugging houses/vehicles	In the interests of national security, for the purpose of preventing or detecting serious crime and in the interests of the economic well-being of the United Kingdom.	The territorial police forces, the Ministry of Defence Police, the British Transport Police, the Royal Navy Regulating Branch, Royal Military Police, Royal Air Force Police and HM Revenue and Customs.	Authorisation from the head of the relevant agency: chief constable of any of the territorial police forces, the Ministry of Defence Police or the British Transport Police, the Provosts Marshal of the Royal Navy Regulating Branch, Royal Military Police or the Royal Air Force Police and a customs officer designated for the purposes by the Commissioners of Revenue and Customs including Border Force.

== Agencies with investigative powers ==
Legislation that stipulates public agencies with investigative powers
- Schedule 1 to the Regulation of Investigatory Powers Act
- The Regulation of Investigatory Powers (Designation of Public Authorities for the Purposes of Intrusive Surveillance) Order 2001
- The Regulation of Investigatory Powers (Communications Data) Order 2003
- The Regulation of Investigatory Powers (Intrusive Surveillance) Order 2003
- The Regulation of Investigatory Powers (Directed Surveillance and Covert Human Intelligence Sources) Order 2003
- The Regulation of Investigatory Powers (Directed Surveillance and Covert Human Intelligence Sources) (Amendment) Order 2005
- The Regulation of Investigatory Powers (Communications Data) (Amendment) Order 2005
- The Regulation of Investigatory Powers (Directed Surveillance and Covert Human Intelligence Sources) (Amendment) Order 2006
- The Regulation of Investigatory Powers (Communications Data) (Additional Functions and Amendment) Order 2006

=== Communications data ===
The type of communications data that can be accessed varies with the reason for its use, and cannot be adequately explained here. Refer to the legislation for more specific information. Relevant agencies:

- Charity Commission
- Criminal Cases Review Commission
- Common Services Agency for the Scottish Health Service
- a county council or district council in England, a London borough council, the Common Council of the City of London in its capacity as a local authority, the Council of the Isles of Scilly, and any county council or county borough council in Wales
- Department for Transport, for the purposes of:
  - Marine Accident Investigation Branch
  - Rail Accident Investigation Branch
  - Air Accidents Investigation Branch
  - Maritime and Coastguard Agency
- a district council within the meaning of the Local Government Act (Northern Ireland) 1972
- Department of Agriculture and Rural Development for Northern Ireland
- Department of Enterprise, Trade and Investment for Northern Ireland (for the purposes of Trading Standards)
- Department of Health (for the purposes of the Medicines and Healthcare products Regulatory Agency)
- Department of Trade and Industry
- Environment Agency
- Financial Conduct Authority
- a fire and rescue authority
- Fire Authority for Northern Ireland
- Food Standards Agency
- Gambling Commission
- Gangmasters Licensing Authority
- Government Communications Headquarters
- Health and Safety Executive
- HM Revenue and Customs
- Home Office (for the purposes of the UK Border Agency)
- Independent Police Complaints Commission
- Information Commissioner
- a Joint Board where it is a fire authority
- Office of Communications
- Office of Fair Trading
- The Pensions Regulator
- Office of the Police Ombudsman for Northern Ireland
- Port of Dover Police
- Port of Liverpool Police
- Post Office Investigation Branch
- Postal Services Commission
- NHS ambulance service Trust
- NHS Counter Fraud and Security Management Service
- Northern Ireland Ambulance Service Health and Social Services Trust
- Northern Ireland Health and Social Services Central Services Agency
- Royal Navy Regulating Branch
- Royal Military Police
- Royal Air Force Police
- Scottish Ambulance Service Board
- a Scottish council where it is a fire authority
- Scottish Environment Protection Agency
- Secret Intelligence Service
- Security Service
- Serious Fraud Office
- the special police forces (including the Scottish Drug Enforcement Agency)
- the territorial police forces
- Welsh Ambulance Services NHS Trust

=== Directed surveillance and covert human intelligence sources ===
The reasons for which the use of directed surveillance & covert human intelligence sources is permitted vary with each authority. Refer to the legislation for more specific information.

- The armed forces
- Charity Commission
- Commission for Healthcare Audit and Inspection
- a county council or district council in England, a London borough council, the Common Council of the City of London in its capacity as a local authority, the Council of the Isles of Scilly, and any county council or county borough council in Wales
- Department for Environment, Food and Rural Affairs (for the purposes of the Marine Fisheries Agency)
- Department of Health (for the purposes of the Medicines and Healthcare products Regulatory Agency)
- Department of Trade and Industry
- Department for Transport (for the purposes of transport security, Vehicle and Operator Services Agency, Driving Standards Agency and Maritime and Coastguard Agency)
- Department for Work and Pensions
- Environment Agency
- Financial Conduct Authority
- a fire authority
- Food Standards Agency
- Gambling Commission
- Gangmasters Licensing Authority
- Government Communications Headquarters
- Commissioners of Revenue and Customs
- Home Office (for the purposes of HM Prison Service and the UK Border Agency)
- Ministry of Defence
- Northern Ireland Office (for the purposes of the Northern Ireland Prison Service)
- Ofcom
- Office of Fair Trading
- Office of the Deputy Prime Minister
- Office of the Police Ombudsman for Northern Ireland
- Postal Services Commission
- Port of Dover Police
- Port of Liverpool Police
- Royal Mail
- Secret Intelligence Service
- Security Service
- Serious Fraud Office
- Welsh Government (for the purposes of the NHS Directorate, NHS Finance Division, Common Agricultural Policy Management Division and Care Standards Inspectorate for Wales)
- a territorial police force or special police force

=== Directed surveillance ===
The reasons for which the use of directed surveillance is permitted vary with each authority. Refer to the legislation for more specific information.

- Health & Safety Executive
- Information Commissioner
- His Majesty's Chief Inspector of Schools in England (for the purposes of the Complaints, Investigation and Enforcement Team)
- General Pharmaceutical Council

== Opposition ==
Before the Bill's passage, several digital rights organisations campaigned against its provisions, particularly the key disclosure requirements in Part III.

The campaign group STAND.org.uk had been formed in December 1998 to oppose the government's earlier key escrow proposals for the Electronic Communications Bill.

In October 1999, the group staged a publicity stunt it called "Operation Dear Jack", targeting Home Secretary Jack Straw. A volunteer wrote a confession to a crime, had it affirmed as a statutory declaration before a solicitor, encrypted the electronic copy with Straw's public PGP key, sent it to him, and then destroyed the plaintext and the only copy of the decryption key. According to STAND, the demonstration was intended to show that the reverse burden of proof in the key disclosure clauses then under consideration could leave a recipient of encrypted material unable to prove they did not hold a key they had never had. STAND later wrote that the RIPA bill's own key disclosure provisions included "safeguards" not present in the "original proposals" exploited by the stunt.

STAND also operated a "fax your MP" tool against the RIPA Bill, which the group said had generated over 1,000 faxes to MPs within a week of its March 2000 launch. STAND campaigner Danny O'Brien said the Bill "contains ill-conceived proposals that will seriously damage UK ecommerce, as well as threaten some basic civil liberties." Cyber-Rights & Cyber-Liberties (UK) director Yaman Akdeniz said the Bill in its then-current form was incompatible with the Human Rights Act 1998 and would create "an intimidating environment for the legitimate use of encryption products by UK citizens."

== Controversy ==
Critics claim that the spectres of terrorism, internet crime and paedophilia were used to push the act through and that there was little substantive debate in the House of Commons. The act has numerous critics, many of whom regard the RIPA regulations as excessive and a threat to civil liberties in the UK. Campaign group Big Brother Watch published a report in 2010 investigating the improper use of RIPA by local councils. Critics such as Keith Vaz, the chairman of the House of Commons home affairs committee, have expressed concern that the act is being abused for "petty and vindictive" cases. Similarly, Brian Binley, Member of Parliament (MP) for Northampton South, has urged councils to stop using the law, accusing them of acting like comic strip detective Dick Tracy.

The Trading Standards Institute has been very critical of these views, stating that the use of surveillance is critical to their success.

The "deniable encryption" features in free software such as FreeOTFE, TrueCrypt and BestCrypt could be said to make the task of investigations featuring RIPA much more difficult.

Another concern is that the Act requires sufficiently large UK ISPs to install technical systems to assist law enforcement agencies with interception activity. Although this equipment must be installed at the ISPs' expense, RIPA does provide that Parliament will examine appropriate funding for ISPs if the cost burden became unfairly high.

=== Accusations of oppressive use ===
In April 2008, it became known that council officials in Poole put three children and their parents under surveillance, at home and in their daily movements, to check whether they lived in a particular school catchment area. Council officials carried out directed surveillance on the family a total of 21 times. Tim Martin, the council's head of legal services, had authorised the surveillance and tried to argue that it was justified under RIPA, but in a subsequent ruling by the Investigatory Powers Tribunal – its first ever ruling – the surveillance was deemed to be unlawful. The same council put fishermen under covert surveillance to check for the illegal harvesting of cockles and clams in ways that are regulated by RIPA. David Smith, deputy commissioner at the ICO (Information Commissioner's Office) stated that he was concerned about the surveillance which took place in Poole. Other councils in the UK have conducted undercover operations regulated by RIPA against dog fouling and fly-tipping. In April 2016, 12 councils said that they use unmanned aerial vehicles for "covert operations", and that such flights are covered by the Regulation of Investigatory Powers Act 2000.

Despite claims in the press that local councils are conducting over a thousand RIPA based covert surveillance operations every month for petty offences such as under-age smoking and breaches of planning regulations, the Office of Surveillance Commissioners' last report shows that public bodies granted 8,477 requests for directed surveillance, down over 1,400 on the previous year. Less than half of those were granted by local authorities, and the commissioner reported that, "Generally speaking, local authorities use their powers sparingly with over half of them granting five or fewer authorisations for directed surveillance. Some sixteen per cent granted none at all."

In June 2008, the chairman of the Local Government Association, Sir Simon Milton, sent out a letter to the leaders of every council in England, urging local governments not to use the new powers granted by RIPA "for trivial matters", and suggested "reviewing these powers annually by an appropriate scrutiny committee".

Especially contentious was Part III of the Act, which requires persons to (allegedly) self-incriminate by disclosing a password to government representatives. Failure to do so is a criminal offence, with a penalty of two years in prison or five years in cases involving national security or child indecency. Using the mechanism of secondary legislation, some parts of the Act required activation by a ministerial order before attaining legal force. Such orders have been made in respect of the relevant sections of Part I, II and III of the RIPA act. The latter became active in October 2007. The first case where the powers were used was against animal rights activists in November 2007.

=== Identification of journalists' sources ===
In October 2014, it was revealed that RIPA had been used by UK police forces to obtain information about journalists' sources in at least two cases. These related to the so-called Plebgate inquiry and the prosecution of Chris Huhne for perversion of the course of justice. In both cases, journalists' telephone records were obtained using the powers of the act in order to identify their sources, bypassing the usual court proceedings needed to obtain such information.

The UK newspaper The Sun made an official written complaint to the Investigatory Powers Tribunal to seek a public review of the London Metropolitan Police's use of anti-terror laws to obtain the phone records of Tom Newton Dunn, its political editor, in relation to its inquiry into the "Plebgate" affair. The Sun's complaint coincided with confirmation that the phone records of the news editor of the Mail on Sunday and one of its freelance journalists had also been obtained by Kent police force when they investigated Chris Huhne's speeding fraud. Journalists' sources are usually agreed to be privileged and protected from disclosure under European laws with which the UK complies. However, by using RIPA an investigating officer just needs approval from a senior officer rather than the formal approval of a court hearing. Media lawyers and press freedom groups are concerned by the use of RIPA because it happens in secret and the press have no way of knowing whether their sources have been compromised. Responding to The Sun's complaint Sir Paul Kennedy, the interception of communications commissioner at the time, launched a full inquiry and urged Home Office ministers to accelerate the introduction of promised protections for journalists, lawyers and others who handle privileged information, including confidential helplines, from such police surveillance operations. He said: "I fully understand and share the concerns raised by the protection of journalistic sources so as to enable a free press. Today I have written to all chief constables and directed them under section 58 (1) of the Regulation of Investigatory Powers Act (Ripa) to provide me with full details of all investigations that have used Ripa powers to acquire communications data to identify journalistic sources. My office will undertake a full inquiry into these matters and report our findings to the prime minister".

On 12 October 2014, the justice minister, Simon Hughes, confirmed on Sky News's Murnaghan programme that the UK government would reform RIPA to prevent the police using surveillance powers to discover journalists' sources. He said that the police's use of RIPA's powers had been "entirely inappropriate" and in future the authorisation of a judge would be needed for police forces to be given approval to access journalists' phone records in pursuit of a criminal investigation. The presumption would be that if a journalist was acting in the public interest, they would be protected, he added. Hughes further said that if the police made an application to a court he would assume a journalist would be informed that the authorities were seeking to access his phone records. As of 2014 more than 100,000 RIPA requests were being made annually for access to communications data against targets including private citizens. It is not known how many have involved journalists' phones.

== Prosecutions under RIPA ==
A number of offences have been prosecuted involving the abuse of investigatory powers. Widely reported cases include the Stanford/Liddell case, the Goodman/Mulcaire Royal voicemail interception, and Operation Barbatus.

Cliff Stanford and George Nelson Liddell pleaded guilty to offences under the Regulation of Investigatory Powers Act in 2005. They were found to have intercepted emails at the company Redbus Interhouse. Stanford was sentenced to six months' imprisonment suspended for two years, and fined £20,000. It was alleged Stanford had intercepted emails between Dame Shirley Porter and John Porter (Chairman of Redbus Interhouse). In 2007, News of the World royal editor Clive Goodman was sentenced to four months in prison for intercepting the voice mail of members of the Royal Family as part of the News International phone hacking scandal. His associate Glenn Mulcaire received a six-month sentence.

In 2007, Operation Barbatus exposed a sophisticated criminal surveillance business organised by corrupt police officers. A former Metropolitan Police officer, Jeremy Young, was jailed for 27 months for various offences including six counts of conspiracy to intercept communications unlawfully. A second former policeman, Scott Gelsthorpe, was sentenced to 24 months for offences including conspiracy to intercept communications unlawfully. Three other former police officers and a private detective were also jailed for their part in running a private detective agency called Active Investigation Services.

In 2008, four people were cautioned for 'Unlawful intercepting of a postal, public or private telecommunications scheme', under ss. 1(1), (2) and (7). Three people were tried for 'Failure to disclose key to protected information' under s. 53 (of which 2 were tried). One person was tried for 'Disclosing details of Section 49 Notice' under s. 54.

In August 2009 it was announced that two people had been prosecuted and convicted for refusing to provide British authorities with their encryption keys, under Part III of the Act. The first of these was sentenced to a term of 9 months' imprisonment. In a 2010 case, Oliver Drage, a 19-year-old takeaway worker being investigated as part of a police investigation into a child exploitation network, was sentenced, at Preston Crown Court, to four months' imprisonment. Mr Drage was arrested in May 2009, after investigating officers searched his home near Blackpool. He had been required, under this act, to provide his 50-character encryption key but had not complied.

== Amendments ==
In October 2020 the Government introduced the Covert Human Intelligence Sources (Criminal Conduct) Bill which allows, in certain circumstances, certain authorities to authorise agents or informants to participate in criminal conduct during covert operations. This bill amended the RIPA act, where required.

== Investigatory Powers Tribunal ==
The 2000 Act established the Investigatory Powers Tribunal to hear complaints about surveillance by public bodies. The Tribunal replaced the Interception of Communications Tribunal, the Security Service Tribunal, and the Intelligence Services Tribunal with effect from 2 October 2000.

Between 2000 and 2009 the tribunal upheld only 4 out of 956 complaints.

== See also ==
- Human Rights Act 1998
- Investigatory Powers Act 2016
- Mass surveillance in the United Kingdom
- Phone hacking
- Rubber-hose cryptanalysis
- Plausible deniability
- Interception Modernisation Programme
- United States v. Boucher, a case in the US courts which determined that a criminal defendant cannot be forced to reveal his encryption passphrase but can be forced to provide a plaintext (decrypted) copy of their encrypted data, if the defendant had previously willingly shown the authorities the drive's contents (i.e., having previously incriminated himself with those contents)
