= Interception of Communications Commissioner =

British regulatory official

The interception of communications commissioner was a regulatory official in the United Kingdom, appointed under section 57 of the Regulation of Investigatory Powers Act 2000, and previously under section 8 of the Interception of Communications Act 1985.

The interception of communications commissioner ensured that government agencies acted in accordance with their legal responsibilities when intercepting communications. The commissioner also reviewed the role of the home secretary in issuing interception warrants.

The interception of communications commissioner has been replaced by the investigatory powers commissioner by the Investigatory Powers Act 2016.

== Commissioners ==
- 1985–1992: Sir Anthony Lloyd
- 1992–1994: Sir Thomas Bingham
- 1994–2000: Lord Nolan
- 2000–2006: Sir Swinton Thomas
- 2006–2012: Sir Paul Kennedy
- 2013–2015: Sir Anthony May
  - Sir Paul Kennedy served as interim Interception of Communications Commissioner during Sir Anthony May's absence July through December 2014.
- 2015–2017: Sir Stanley Burnton

== See also ==
- Intelligence Services Commissioner
- Information Commissioner's Office
