= Charles Farr (civil servant) =

British civil servant (1959–2019)

Sir Charles Farr CMG OBE

Chair of the Joint Intelligence Committee
- In office November 2015 – February 2019
- Prime Minister: David Cameron; Theresa May
- Preceded by: Sir John Day
- Succeeded by: Sir Simon Gass

Director of the Office for Security and Counter-Terrorism
- In office July 2007 – November 2015
- Prime Minister: Gordon Brown; David Cameron
- Home Secretary: Jacqui Smith; Alan Johnson; Theresa May

Personal details
- Born: 15 July 1959 Bath, Somerset, England
- Died: 15 February 2019 (aged 59)
- Education: Monkton Combe School
- Alma mater: Magdalen College, Oxford

Sir Charles Blandford Farr CMG OBE (15 July 1959 – 15 February 2019) was a British civil servant, intelligence officer, and diplomat. He was Chairman of the Joint Intelligence Committee and Head of the Joint Intelligence Organisation at the Cabinet Office until his death in February 2019. Before that, from 2007 until 2015 Farr was the Director of the Office for Security and Counter-Terrorism (OSCT) at the United Kingdom's Home Office.

== Early life and education ==
Farr was educated at Monkton Combe School, then an all-boys private boarding school in Somerset. He studied at Magdalen College, Oxford, where he completed a DPhil in the philosophy of aesthetics.

== Career ==
Farr worked for the Secret Intelligence Service (MI6) in Afghanistan in the 1980s, in southern Africa and the Middle East. Farr was MI6's director of security and public affairs at the time of his appointment to the OSCT by John Reid, then Home Secretary, in the wake of the 2006 transatlantic aircraft plot. This role made him the senior government official responsible for counter terrorist and organised crime strategy.

In 2010 Farr was the recipient of a strategic briefing paper from the Quilliam think tank, the paper being a confidential review of the British government's anti-terrorism Prevent strategy. The paper was "particularly critical of the view that government partnerships with non-violent yet otherwise extreme Islamists were the best way to fend off Jihadism." The report provoked protests from various groups which had been identified in the Quilliam briefing as sympathetic or supportive of Islamist extremism, and was described as "McCarthyite" by Inayat Bunglawala, chairman of Muslims4Uk and Fatima Khan, vice-chair of the Muslim Safety Forum. Bunglawala added: "In effect, Quilliam – a body funded very generously by the government through Prevent – are attempting to set themselves up as arbiters of who is and is not an acceptable Muslim." A Home Office spokesman told the press that the report had not been solicited but added: "We believe the Prevent programme isn't working as effectively as it could and want a strategy that is effective and properly focused – that is why we are reviewing it." Farr has been described as a "key figure" behind the operation of control orders and 'TPIM notices', their successors.

Farr was passed over for the role of head of MI6, he also failed to be appointed Permanent Secretary at the Home Office. The Guardian reported that several officials at the Home Office threatened to resign if Farr were promoted to the top job.

Farr was responsible for the Prevent anti-terrorism strategy, the Interception Modernisation Programme under Labour and the current Communications Capabilities Development Programme, both being projects to enable to the government to surveil the traffic data of ordinary Internet communications of UK citizens. The programme has resulted in the draft Communications Data Bill 2012. During the 2012 Summer Olympics in London, Farr was in charge of security, where he was behind the siting of missiles on the roofs of residential buildings in East London.

The Financial Times reported in April 2014 that Farr was one of three people shortlisted for the role of Director of the Government Communications Headquarters (GCHQ).

In May 2014, Farr made a witness statement on behalf of the government and the three main intelligence agencies for the Investigatory Powers Tribunal, in a legal case brought by advocacy groups including Privacy International, Liberty and Amnesty International, explaining the legal basis for the interception of electronic communications under the Regulation of Investigatory Powers Act 2000. This was characterised in the media as an explanation of how the security services can legally monitor "Facebook, Google and Twitter" usage by UK citizens.

In June 2014, there was a very public argument between the Home Office and Department for Education about alleged extremism in Birmingham schools. The Prime Minister David Cameron intervened and forced Education Secretary Michael Gove to apologise to Farr for briefings critical of him which appeared on the front page of The Times.

On 23 November 2015, Farr was announced as the next Chair of the Joint Intelligence Committee (JIC). The JIC is part of the Cabinet Office.

== Personality ==
In a profile of Farr, The Guardian newspaper said that:

The problem for some is that Farr is not a politician, answerable to parliament, and is certainly not a conventional civil servant. Instead, critics say, he has never stopped acting like a spy. The man who should be assessing recommendations from the security services and offering advice to policymakers, they say, behaves instead like MI6's man in government, driving forward policies that suit his hawkish agenda.

The director of national security and resilience at the Royal United Services Institute, Charlie Edwards, said that Farr is "...not just an effective operator in the field, he is one of the most committed civil servants you will come across... Yes, he is robust, but first and foremost he is fair and most importantly he gets the job done." Shami Chakrabarti, the director of the civil liberties advocacy organisation Liberty, described Farr as "...the only person ever to shout at me in the Home Office. I prefer awesome power to be wielded by humbler hands and officials to be both civil and servants."

== Honours ==
In the 2003 New Year Honours, Farr was appointed an Officer of the Order of the British Empire (OBE) in recognition of his service as a First Secretary in the Foreign and Commonwealth Office. In the 2010 New Year Honours, he was appointed a Companion of the Order of St Michael and St George (CMG) in recognition of his service as a Counsellor in the Foreign and Commonwealth Office. Farr received a Knighthood shortly before his death from cancer, aged 59.

Government offices
New title	Director, Office for Security and Counter-Terrorism; 2007-2015	Unknown
Preceded by Jon Day	Chair of the Joint Intelligence Committee; 2015–2019	Succeeded by Simon Gass
