= HMS Ferret =

Fifteen ships and two shore establishments of the Royal Navy have borne the name HMS Ferret, after the domestic mammal, the Ferret:

- HMS Ferret (1704) was a 10-gun sloop launched in 1704 that the French captured in 1706.
- HMS Ferret (1711) was a 10-gun sloop launched in 1711 that the Spanish captured in 1718.
- HMS Ferret (1721) was a 6-gun sloop launched in 1721 and sold in 1731.
- HMS Ferret (1743) was a 14-gun sloop launched in 1743; she foundered in a hurricane in 1757.
- HMS Ferret (1760) was a 14-gun sloop launched in 1760; she foundered in a hurricane in 1776.
- HMS Ferret (1763) was a 6-gun cutter launched in 1763 and sold in 1781.
- HMS Ferret (1784) was a 12-gun brig-sloop launched in 1784 and sold in 1801; she then became a whaler, making six voyages to Brazil, the South Pacific, and New Zealand between 1802 and 1815.
- HMS Ferret (1794) was a 4-gun gunboat. She was a Dutch hoy purchased in 1794 and sold in 1802.
- HMS Ferret (1799) was a 6-gun schooner purchased in 1799 that the Spanish captured that same year.
- HMS Ferret (1806) was an 18-gun Cruizer-class brig-sloop launched in 1806 and wrecked in 1813.
- HMS Ferret was a 14-gun gun-brig, previously the American privateer Rapid. After HMS Maidstone captured her in 1813 she became HMS Nova Scotia. The Admiralty renamed her HMS Ferret in 1813 and sold her in 1820.
- HMS Ferret (1821) was a 10-gun Cherokee-class brig-sloop launched in 1821 and sold in 1837.
- HMS Ferret (1840) was an 8-gun brig launched in 1840 and wrecked in 1869.
- HMS Ferret (1893) was a Ferret-class destroyer, later merged into the A class. She was launched in 1893, was dismantled in 1910 and sunk as a target in 1911.
- HMS Ferret (1911) was an Acheron-class destroyer launched in 1911 and sold in 1921.
- HMS Ferret (1940 shore establishment) was the Royal Navy's shore base at Londonderry, Northern Ireland between 1940 and 1947.
- HMS Ferret (1982 shore establishment) is a Royal Naval Reserve training centre formed in 1989 at the Intelligence Corps centre in Ashford, Kent. The unit transferred with the Corps and the Defence Intelligence and Security Centre to Chicksands in 1997.

== See also ==
- HMS Ferreter
- There was also a Ferret that served as a tender to Abergavenny on the Jamaica station in the late 1790s.
