= 1st Military Intelligence Brigade =

Defunct formation of the British Army

- Brigade TRF
- Active: Before 2007–2014
- Country: United Kingdom
- Branch: British Army
- Type: Military Intelligence Formation
- Size: Brigade
- Part of: Headquarters Theatre Troops
- Garrison/HQ: Chicksands Station
- Nickname: 1 MI Bde
- Engagements: Operation Telic; Operation Herrick
- Website: 1 Military Intelligence Brigade

1st Military Intelligence Brigade (1 MI Bde) was a formation of the British Army formed after the Future Army Structure review reform, but in 2014 was absorbed into the new 1st Intelligence, Surveillance and Reconnaissance Brigade.

== History ==
After the 2003 Iraq War, code-named Operation Telic by the British Army, a thorough reorganisation of the combat service support forces took place, known as the Future Army Structure. As part of this reorganisation, new 'support brigades' were formed. One of the new formations create was the 1st Military Intelligence Brigade, which commanded the military intelligence and psychological operation troops. Other new formations included the 8th Engineer Brigade and 2nd Medical Brigade. The brigade's mission was "to command troops, and to prepare, deliver & sustain MI (military intelligence) & PSYOPS (Psychological operations) formations in order to conduct land operations in support of Land Command and Defence tasks".

Even though the brigade never deployed, its sub-units did have detachments serve during Operation Telic and Operation Herrick. Under the Army 2020 programme announced in 2010, intelligence, surveillance, and reconnaissance formations were to be grouped together to form a new unit under Force Troops Command. Therefore, by September 2014 the brigade was disbanded and its military intelligence battalions went to form part of 1st Intelligence, Surveillance and Reconnaissance Brigade, while 15 Psychological Operations Group moved to 77th Brigade.

== Organisation ==
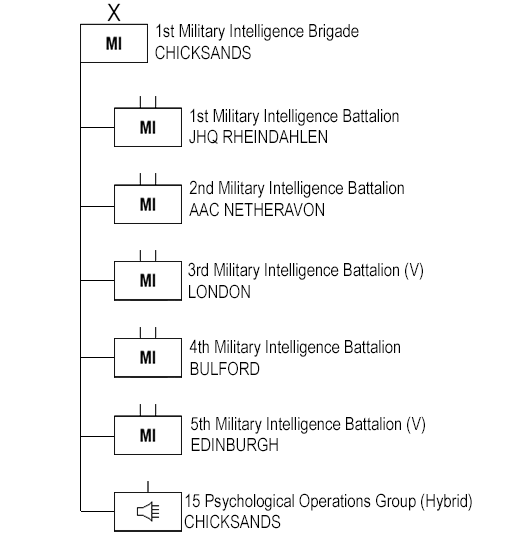
1 MI Bde Graphic

Brigade organisation was:

- Headquarters 1st Military Intelligence Brigade, at Chicksands Station
  - 1st Military Intelligence Battalion, at Joint Headquarters Rheindahlen, Germany (supporting 1st (United Kingdom) Armoured Division)
  - 2nd Military Intelligence Battalion, at AAC Netheravon (Intelligence Exploitation)
  - 3rd Military Intelligence Battalion (TA), HQ in London (supporting HQ ARRC, Permanent Joint Headquarters, and Defence Intelligence Staff)
  - 4th Military Intelligence Battalion, at Ward Barracks, Bulford Camp (supporting 3rd (United Kingdom) Mechanised Division)
  - 5th Military Intelligence Battalion (TA), HQ in Edinburgh – formed on 1 April 2008
  - 15 Psychological Operations Group, at Chicksands Station (Joint Tri-Services)
