= Communications Data Bill =

The Communications Data Bill refers to two bills of the Parliament of the United Kingdom.

- The Communications Data Bill 2008, proposed by the Labour government in 2008 but never published as a draft bill;
- Its successor, the Draft Communications Data Bill, a draft bill produced for consultation by the Conservative-Liberal Democrat coalition government in 2012 but never introduced into Parliament.

== See also ==
- Investigatory Powers Bill, the successor to the above introduced into Parliament by the Conservative government in 2016.
