= HMS Ferret (shore establishment) =

Two shore establishments of the Royal Navy have borne the name HMS Ferret:

- HMS Ferret (1940 shore establishment) was the Royal Navy's Londonderry base during the Second World War, established in 1940 and closed in 1947, becoming HMS Sea Eagle.
- HMS Ferret (1982 shore establishment) is a training unit of the Royal Naval Reserve established in 1983 and currently active.

== See also ==
- HMS Ferret
