= Snooper's Charter =

Snooper's Charter may refer to:

- Investigatory Powers Act 2016, which comprehensively sets out and expands the electronic surveillance powers of the UK Intelligence Community
- Draft Communications Data Bill, a draft bill produced for consultation in 2012 but never introduced to Parliament
- Online Safety Act 2023, a 2023 act seeking to have age verification for pornography and allow examination of end-to-end encrypted messages.
