= Jon Day =

British civil servant

Sir Jonathan Stephen Day CBE (born 23 April 1954) is a retired British Civil Servant lately serving as the Chairman of the Joint Intelligence Committee and Head of the Joint Intelligence Organisation at the Cabinet Office.

Day initially trained as a solicitor, and joined the Civil Service in 1979. During his career, Day worked in the Ministry of Defence, the Foreign & Commonwealth Office and the Cabinet Office, was seconded to NATO, and did a year's sabbatical at Harvard University. Day retired at the end of November 2015, and was replaced by Charles Farr as Chair of the JIC.

== Honours ==
Day was appointed Commander of the Order of the British Empire (CBE) in the 1999 New Year Honours for his contribution to the Strategic Defence Review as Director of Defence Policy at the MoD and was knighted in the 2016 New Year Honours.

Government offices
Unknown	Director-General, Security Policy; Ministry of Defence; 2008–2011	Succeeded by Not disclosed as Director-General, Security Policy & Operations
Preceded by Ursula Brennan	Second Permanent Secretary; Ministry of Defence; 2011–2012	Succeeded by Post abolished
Preceded by Sir Alex Allan	Chair of the Joint Intelligence Committee; 2012–2015	Succeeded by Charles Farr
