= CCDP =

CCDP can mean:

- Communications Capabilities Development Programme, a UK government surveillance initiative
- Cisco Certified Design Professional, one of the Cisco Career Certifications
