= Matthew Jones (British Army officer) =

British Army officer

Lieutenant General Matthew Jones OBE
- Military career
- Allegiance: United Kingdom
- Branch: British Army
- Rank: Lieutenant General
- Commands: 4 Military Intelligence Battalion; 1 Intelligence, Surveillance and Reconnaissance Brigade; Defence Intelligence
- Conflicts: Afghanistan War
- Awards: Officer of the Order of the British Empire

Lieutenant General Matthew Howard Jones OBE is a senior British Army officer, who has been Chief of Defence Intelligence since June 2026.

== Military career ==
Jones was commissioned into the Intelligence Corps in 1998. He became commanding officer of 4 Military Intelligence Battalion in 2015, Chief of Staff of HQ Force Troops Command in August 2017 and Chief of Staff of 6th (UK) Division in 2019. He went on to be commander of 1 Intelligence, Surveillance and Reconnaissance Brigade in July 2020, Head of Military Strategy and Plans at the Ministry of Defence in December 2021 and Director Intelligence, Surveillance and Reconnaissance at Defence Intelligence in August 2023.

Jones became Chief of Defence Intelligence in June 2026, and was promoted to lieutenant general on 29 June 2026.

Jones was appointed Member of the Order of the British Empire in the 2013 Birthday Honours and advanced to an Officer of the Order of the British Empire in the 2021 New Year Honours.

Military offices
Preceded by Adrian Bird	Chief of Defence Intelligence; 2026–present	Incumbent
