= HMS Ferret (1982 shore establishment) =

Training unit of the Royal Naval Reserve

HMS Ferret
- Part of MOD Chicksands
- Near Shefford, Bedfordshire in England

Site information
- Type: Military training establishment
- Owner: Ministry of Defence
- Operator: Royal Navy
- Controlled by: Royal Naval Reserve
- Condition: Operational
- Website: Official website

Location
- Location in Bedfordshire
- Coordinates: 52°02′29″N 000°21′31″W

Site history
- Built: 1997
- In use: 1997 – present

Garrison information
- Current commander: Commander K Boyle
- Occupants: Intelligence Branch

HMS Ferret is a training unit of the Royal Naval Reserve based at MOD Chicksands in Bedfordshire.

== History ==
HMS Ferret was initially established at Templer Barracks, Ashford, Kent, an Intelligence Corps training establishment, as a regional headquarters of the Royal Naval Reserve. Templer Barracks closed in 1997, the land being required for construction of railway works for the highspeed Eurostar connection through the newly completed Channel Tunnel. Ferret moved to Chicksands when Headquarters Intelligence Corps moved to Chicksands in 1997.

HMS Ferret is the headquarters of the Intelligence branch of the RNR.

== See also ==
- Military intelligence
