= Joint Intelligence Organisation =

Joint Intelligence Organisation may refer to:

- Joint Intelligence Organisation (Australia)
- Joint Intelligence Organisation (United Kingdom)
