= James Hockenhull =

British Army general (born 1964)

General Sir James Hockenhull KBE
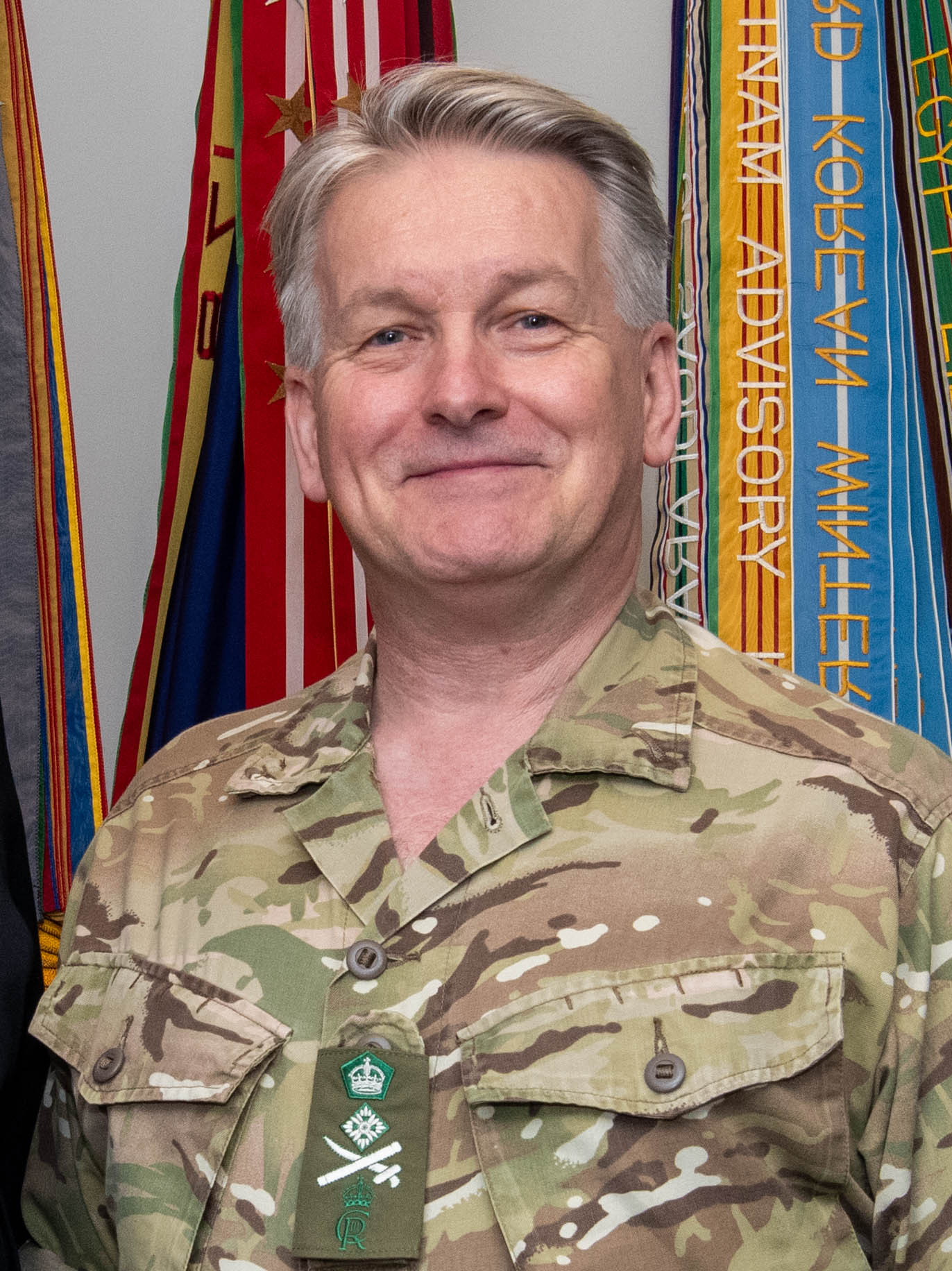
- General Hockenhull in 2024
- Born: 27 July 1964 (age 62); Havant, Hampshire
- Military career
- Allegiance: United Kingdom
- Branch: British Army
- Service years: 1986–2026
- Rank: General
- Unit: Intelligence Corps
- Commands: UK Strategic Command; Chief of Defence Intelligence
- Conflicts: Operation Banner; Iraq War; Afghanistan War
- Awards: Knight Commander of the Order of the British Empire; Queen's Commendation for Valuable Service; Officer of the Legion of Merit (United States); Bronze Star Medal (United States)

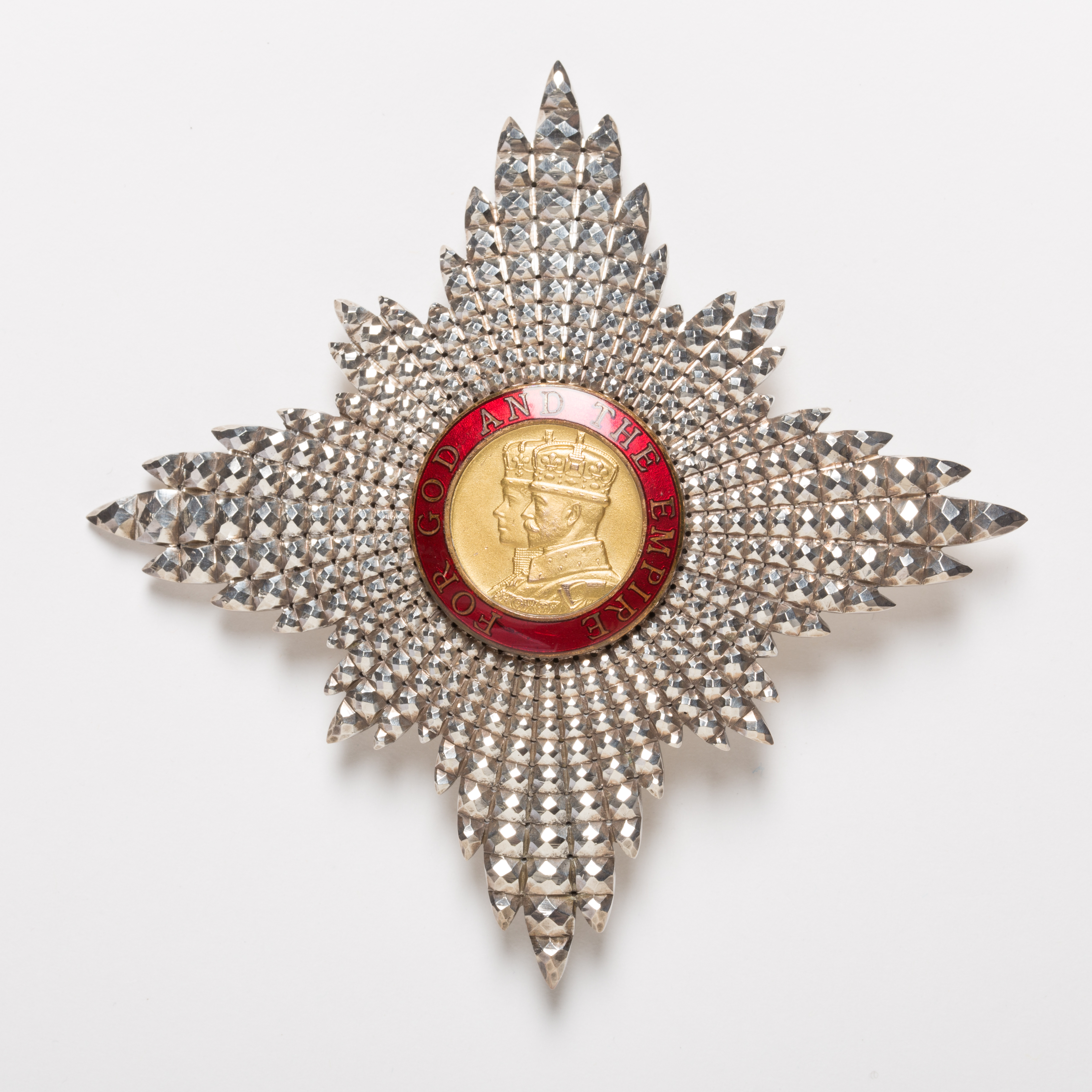
KBE breast star

General Sir James Richard Hockenhull KBE (born 27 July 1964) is a former senior British Army officer who served as Commander of UK Strategic Command from 2022 to 2026.

== Background and education ==
Hockenhull was born in 1964 at Havant, Hampshire, to William Hockenhull and Jean née Philpott.

Educated at the Royal Hospital School, Ipswich, before studying Politics at the University of York (BA), he later pursued postgraduate Military Studies at Cranfield University (MA).

== Military career ==
Hockenhull was commissioned into the Intelligence Corps in 1986. He deployed to Northern Ireland many times during his early career, for which he was appointed a Member of the Order of the British Empire (MBE) on 22 November 1994, awarded a Queen's Commendation for Valuable Service "in recognition of gallant and distinguished services" in 1999, and promoted Officer of the Order of the British Empire (OBE) on 30 September 2003.

Hockenhull became an Instructor at the United States Army Command and General Staff College at Fort Leavenworth, Kansas, in 2003 before being deployed as Chief, Campaign Plans at Headquarters Multi-National Force – Iraq in December 2005, for which he was awarded the United States Bronze Star Medal in 2006. He went on to be Deputy Director, Force Development in August 2006, Chief, Plans at Headquarters Allied Rapid Reaction Corps in Afghanistan in 2008 and Director ISTAR at Headquarters Land Forces in 2008. After that he became Head Military Strategic Planning at the Ministry of Defence in September 2011, Director of the Ministry of Defence Advisory Group in Kabul in June 2012, and Director Cyber, Intelligence and Information Integration in March 2015. He was awarded the United States Officer of the Legion of Merit in 2017. The following year, Hockenhull was appointed Chief of Defence Intelligence and promoted to lieutenant general. He was advanced as a Knight Commander of the Order of the British Empire (KBE) in the 2021 New Year Honours.

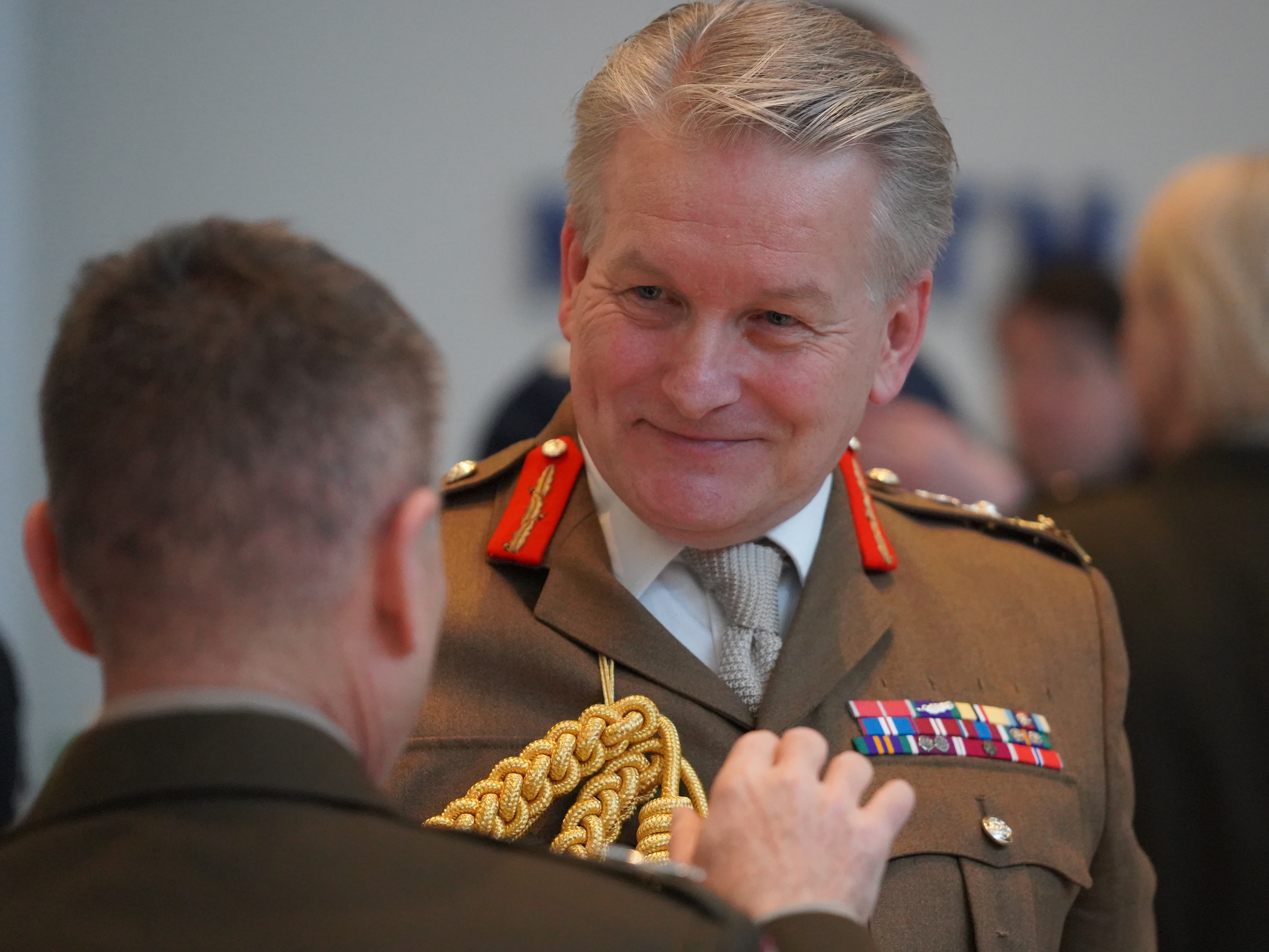
General Sir James Hockenhull at Washington, D.C. in 2023

In April 2022, it was announced that Hockenhull would be promoted as general to succeed General Sir Patrick Sanders as Commander of United Kingdom Strategic Command, taking office in May 2022. He was succeeded by General Sir Robert Magowan in March 2026, when Strategic Command was changed to Cyber & Specialist Operations Command. Hockenhull formally retired from the army on 24 June 2026.

Hockenhull stated, on 13 August 2022, in an interview with the BBC: "Russia nor Ukraine is likely to achieve any decisive military action in Ukraine this year". He has defended the decision to publish the intelligence about the Russian invasion of Ukraine, saying "It's important to get the truth out before the lies come." UK intelligence is watching the prospect of tactical nuclear weapons being used in Ukraine "very closely"; he however considers their usage "very unlikely". He is quoted saying of China: "incredible military modernisation with a country determined to resolve a political issue".

He was Colonel Commandant of the Intelligence Corps from 2014 to 2026, and has also been elected a Visiting Fellow of Pembroke College, Cambridge.

== Family ==
In 1990 he married Karen Elizabeth Harrison; Hockenhull and his wife have two daughters.

== See also ==
- Intelligence, Surveillance and Reconnaissance Group

Military offices
Preceded by Philip Osborn	Chief of Defence Intelligence; 2018–2022	Succeeded by Adrian Bird
Preceded by Sir Patrick Sanders	Commander Strategic Command; 2022–2026	Succeeded by Robert Magowan
