= Simon Gass =

British Civil servant, former British diplomat

Sir Simon Gass GCMG CVO
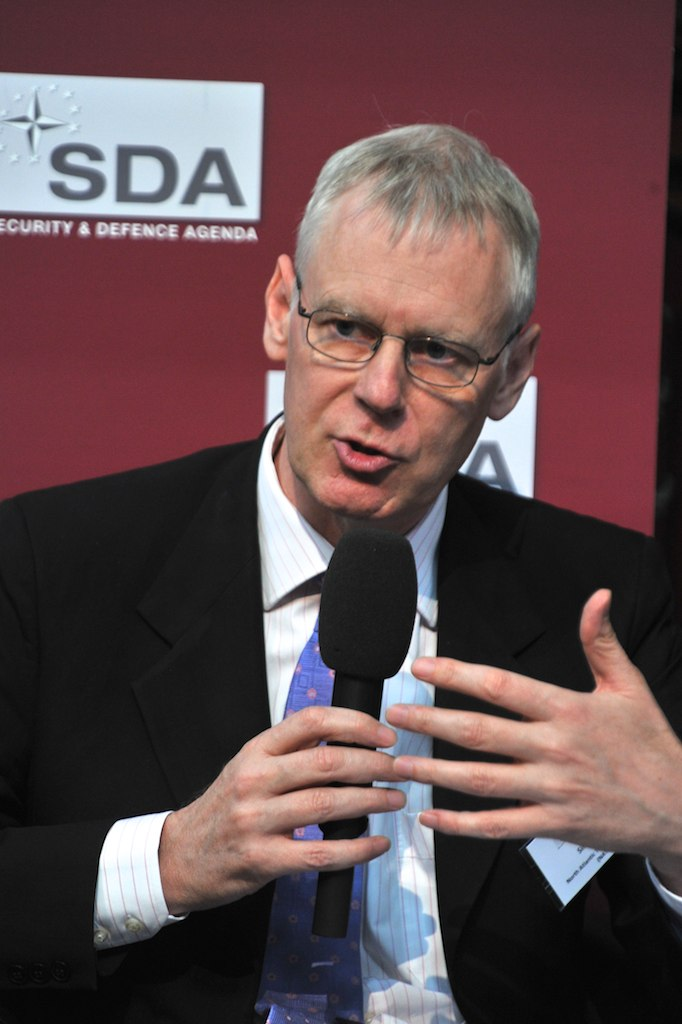
- Gass in June 2011

Chairman of the Joint Intelligence Committee
- In office 2019 – July 2023
- Prime Minister: Theresa May; Boris Johnson; Rishi Sunak
- Preceded by: Charles Farr
- Succeeded by: Madeleine Alessandri

British Ambassador to Iran
- In office 2009–2011
- Prime Minister: Gordon Brown; David Cameron
- Preceded by: Sir Geoffrey Adams
- Succeeded by: Dominick Chilcott

Personal details
- Born: 2 November 1956 (age 69)
- Spouse: Marianne Enid Stott (1980–present)
- Children: 3
- Education: University of Reading

Sir Simon Lawrance Gass GCMG CVO (born 2 November 1956) is a British civil servant. He chaired the Joint Intelligence Committee from 2019 to 2023 and served as the British Prime Minister's representative on Afghanistan from 2021 to 2022 concurrently. Between 2018 and 2019, he was the Commandant of the Royal College of Defence Studies. During his diplomatic career, he served as British ambassador to Greece and to Iran. In May 2023, it was announced he was stepping down as Chairman of the Joint Intelligence Committee and succeeded by Madeleine Alessandri.

== Career ==
- 1977 – Joined the FCO
- 1979–83 – Lagos
- 1984–87 – Athens
- 1987–90 – FCO in London
- 1990–92 – Assistant Private Secretary to Foreign Secretary, London
- 1992–95 – Rome
- 1995–98 – Counsellor, FCO
- 1998–01 – Deputy High Commissioner South Africa
- 2001–04 – Director, Resources, then Finance, FCO
- 2004–09 – Ambassador to Greece
- 2009–11 – Ambassador to Iran
- 2011–12 – NATO Senior Civilian Representative in Afghanistan
- 2013–16 – Political Director, FCO, and Prime Minister's Special Representative for Afghanistan and Pakistan
- 2017–present – Chair of the FCDO Services Board
- 2018–2019 – Commandant Royal College of Defence Studies
- 2021–2022 – Prime Minister’s Special Representative for the Afghan Transition
- 2019–2023 – Chair of the Joint Intelligence Committee

=== Ambassador to Iran ===
He was British Ambassador to Iran 2009–11. He arrived in post during the spring of 2009 from his previous posting in Greece and was present during the June 2009 protests following the disputed re-election of Iranian President Mahmoud Ahmedinejad.

Following these events Gass posted his views from Tehran on the social networking site Twitter, commenting on the Iranian regime's record on human rights, political prisoners and freedom of speech. His 'tweets' are shared widely by Iranian reformists and diaspora across the web as well as being featured in mainstream media. In January 2011, Gass passed the 1000 follower mark, making him one of the most followed diplomats on Twitter.

In December 2010, Gass's digital activities caused mild uproar among Iranian politicians, who called for his expulsion after he highlighted the case of human rights lawyer Nasrin Sotoudeh in an article posted on the British Embassy in Iran website. The statement was released on International Human Rights Day and criticised Iran's human rights record. The Foreign and Commonwealth Office defended Gass's comments, which gained widespread approval from his Iranian reformist followers on Twitter.

=== NATO and FCO ===
In February 2011 Gass was seconded to NATO as Senior Civilian Representative in Afghanistan. After serving in this post for 18 months he returned to the FCO in London as Director General, Political, and the Prime Minister's Special Representative for Afghanistan and Pakistan. He retired from the FCO in 2016.

=== FCDO Services ===
In 2017, Gass was appointed Non-Executive Director and Chair of the Board of FCDO Services.

== Honours ==
Gass was appointed Companion of the Order of St Michael and St George (CMG) in the 1998 Birthday Honours, Knight Commander of the Order of St Michael and St George (KCMG) in the 2011 New Year Honours, and Knight Grand Cross of the Order of St Michael and St George (GCMG) in the 2023 Birthday Honours for services to national security and British foreign policy.

Diplomatic posts
Preceded by Sir David Madden	British Ambassador to Greece; 2004–2009	Succeeded by David Landsman
Preceded by Sir Geoffrey Adams	British Ambassador to Iran; 2009–2011	Succeeded by Dominick Chilcott
Military offices
Preceded by Sir Tom Phillips	Commandant of the Royal College of Defence Studies; 2018–2019	Succeeded by John Kingwell
Government offices
Preceded by Charles Farr	Chair of the Joint Intelligence Committee	Succeeded by Madeleine Alessandri
