= Madeleine Alessandri =

British civil servant (born 1965)

Dame Madeleine Alessandri DCB CMG

Chair of the Joint Intelligence Committee
- In office 2023–2026
- Preceded by: Sir Simon Gass
- Succeeded by: Adrian Bird

Dame Madeleine Kay Alessandri DCB, CMG (born 1965) is a British civil servant who has had a career in the security and diplomatic services. In 2026 she was given the job of reporting to the government on climate-related national security risks. She has served as the Chair of the Joint Intelligence Committee from 2023 until July 2026.

== Early career ==
Alessandri studied Economics with International Relations at the University of St. Andrews, and then joined government service in 1988. After a number of roles in overseas national security and diplomatic service, including serving as Political Counsellor at the British Embassy in Japan from 2004 to 2007, following Colin Roberts, Alessandri ultimately became a director in the Foreign and Commonwealth Office.

== Senior roles ==
From July 2018 until early 2020, Alessandri transferred to the Cabinet Office, where she served as one of the UK's Deputy National Security Advisers alongside David Quarrey, supporting the prime minister on national resilience and security. She also serves as National Honorary Chair of the Civil Service Retirement Fellowship since January 2020.

Between January 2020 and June 2023, Alessandri served as Permanent Secretary of the Northern Ireland Office.

In May 2023, it was announced that Alessandri was appointed as Chair of the Joint Intelligence Committee, succeeding Sir Simon Gass. She completed her three year tour in 2026, with Adrian Bird announced as her replacement.

In November 2026, she was given the task of reporting on climate-related national security risks to the government. According to The Guardian, Alessandri's JIC had created a secret report that summarised the impact of climate change and other problems that might cause chaos owing to mass migration, shortages or high prices of food and potentially competition between countries capable of making nuclear threats.

== Honours ==
Alessandri was appointed a Companion of the Order of St Michael and St George (CMG) in the Queen's Birthday Honours in June 2017 for her "services to British foreign policy", while serving as a director at the Foreign and Commonwealth Office. Alessandri was appointed Dame Commander of the Order of the Bath (DCB) in the 2025 Birthday Honours "for public service".

== Offices held ==
Government offices
Preceded by Richard Moore	Deputy National Security Adviser; 2018–2020	Succeeded by Beth Sizeland
Preceded by Sir Jonathan Stephens	Permanent Secretary of the Northern Ireland Office; 2020–2023	Succeeded by Julie Harrison
Preceded by Sir Simon Gass	Chair of the Joint Intelligence Committee; 2023–2026	Succeeded by Adrian Bird
