= Alan Richards =

Royal Navy Vice Admiral (born 1958)

Vice Admiral Alan Richards CB JP DL
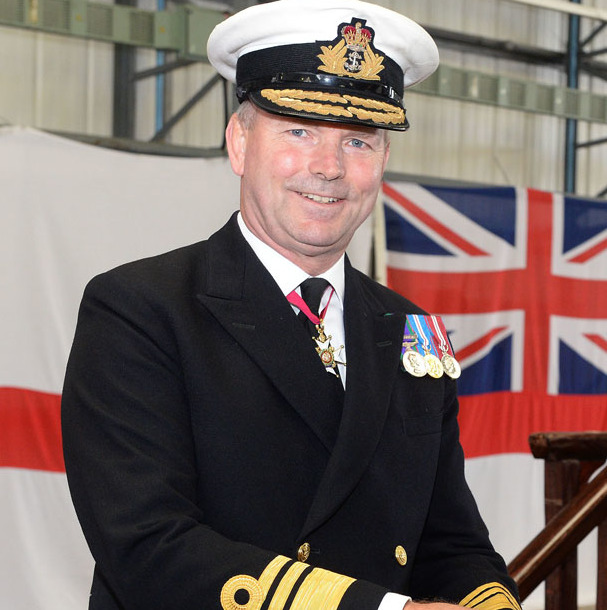
- Vice Admiral Richards in 2014
- Born: 1958 (age 67–68)
- Military career
- Allegiance: United Kingdom
- Branch: Royal Navy
- Service years: 1977–2015
- Rank: Vice Admiral
- Commands: Chief of Defence Intelligence; United Kingdom Carrier Strike Group; HMS Cumberland; HMS Monmouth
- Conflicts: Gulf War
- Awards: Companion of the Order of the Bath

Vice Admiral Alan David Richards, CB, JP, DL (born 1958) is a retired Royal Navy officer who served as Chief of Defence Intelligence from 2012 to 2015.

== Naval career ==
Richards joined the Royal Navy in 1977. He became commanding officer of the frigate HMS Monmouth and then of the frigate HMS Cumberland in which he saw operational service during the Gulf War.

He went on to be Director of Force Development in 2002, Commander United Kingdom Carrier Strike Group in 2006, Assistant Chief of Defence Staff (International Security Policy) in 2007 and then Assistant Chief of Defence Staff (Resources and Plans) in 2009. He became Chief of Defence Intelligence in January 2012 on promotion to vice admiral. In the 2012 Queen's Birthday Honours, he was appointed a Companion of the Order of the Bath (CB).

Richards retired from the Royal Navy on 7 May 2015.

Military offices
| Preceded by Chris Nickols | Chief of Defence Intelligence; 2012–2015 | Succeeded by Philip Osborn |
