= Joint Intelligence Committee (United Kingdom) =

British interagency intelligence organisation

Committee overview
- Formed: 1936
- Committee executive: Madeleine Alessandri
- Parent department: Cabinet Office
- Website: Joint Intelligence Committee website

The Joint Intelligence Committee (JIC) is an interagency deliberative body of the United Kingdom responsible for intelligence assessment, coordination, and oversight of the Secret Intelligence Service, Security Service, GCHQ, and Defence Intelligence. The JIC is supported by the Joint Intelligence Organisation under the Cabinet Office.

== History ==
The JIC was founded on 7 July 1936 as a sub-committee of the Committee of Imperial Defence, the advisory peacetime defence planning agency. During World War II, it became the senior intelligence assessment body in the UK. In 1957 the JIC moved to the Cabinet Office, where its assessments staff prepare draft intelligence assessments for the committee to consider.

=== Role in the Iraq dossier ===
The JIC played a controversial role in compiling a dossier in which the UK government highlighted the threat posed by Iraq's weapons of mass destruction in the run up to the Iraq War. There were allegations that the dossier was "sexed up" prior to publication in order to bolster the case for military action. Evidence that the wording of the dossier was "strengthened" was presented to the Hutton Inquiry, a judicial review set up to investigate the circumstances leading up to the death of an eminent government weapons expert, David Kelly, who had criticised the wording of the dossier in off-the-record briefings to journalists. Doctor Kelly committed suicide shortly after his identity was confirmed to the media by the government. JIC members Sir John Scarlett and Sir Richard Dearlove (both then head of MI6, the Secret Intelligence Service) gave evidence to the Inquiry in which they argued that the words used in the dossier were consistent with their assessment of the intelligence available at the time.

Despite the work of the 1400 strong Iraq Survey Group in post-war Iraq, no evidence of actual WMD capability has so far been uncovered; according to its final report in September 2004. The US and UK Governments both announced investigations into the assessment of WMD intelligence in the run up to war. The British inquiry, headed by Lord Butler of Brockwell, in its report in July 2004, while critical of the British intelligence community, did not recommend that anyone should resign. Similarly, the US Senate Intelligence Committee, while critical of US intelligence officials, did not recommend any resignations in its report, also issued in July 2004.

== Structure ==
The committee is chaired by a permanent chairman, a member of the Senior Civil Service, and is supported by the Joint Intelligence Organisation which includes an assessments staff. The assessment staff is made up of experienced senior analysts drawn from across government and the military and conducts all-source analysis on subjects of interest to the committee. JIC papers draw input from across the intelligence and security agencies and other related bodies.

Membership comprises senior officials in the Foreign and Commonwealth Office, Ministry of Defence and United Kingdom Armed Forces, Home Office, Department for International Development, HM Treasury and the Cabinet Office.

The JIC is subject to oversight by the Intelligence and Security Committee. It is supported by the Joint Intelligence Organisation.

== Role and functions ==
The JIC is responsible for:

- assessing events and situations relating to external affairs, defence, terrorism, major international criminal activity, scientific, technical and international economic matters and other transnational issues, drawing on secret intelligence, diplomatic reporting and open source material
- to monitor and give early warning of the development of direct and indirect threats and opportunities in those fields to British interests or policies and to the international community as a whole
- to keep under review threats to security at home and overseas and to deal with such security problems as may be referred to it
- to contribute to the formulation of statements of the requirements and priorities for intelligence gathering and other tasks to be conducted by the intelligence agencies
- to maintain oversight of the intelligence community's analytical capability through the Professional Head of Intelligence Analysis
- to maintain liaison with Commonwealth and foreign intelligence organisations as appropriate, and to consider the extent to which its product can be made available to them

The JIC has three functions:

- Advising the Prime Minister and Cabinet Ministers on intelligence collection and analysis priorities in support of national objectives.
- Periodically scrutinises the performance of the Agencies in meeting the collection requirements placed upon them.
- Assuring the professional standards of civilian intelligence analysis staff across the range of intelligence related activities in His Majesty's Government.

=== Intelligence requirements ===
The JIC drafts the annual Requirements and Priorities for collection and analysis, for approval by Ministers. These support the strategic national security objectives of the UK:

- Protect UK and British territories, and British nationals and property, from a range of threats, including from terrorism and espionage;
- Protect and promote Britain's defence and foreign policy interests;
- Protect and promote the UK's economic well-being; and
- Support the prevention and detection of serious crime.

=== Foreign liaison ===
Ever since World War II, the chief of the London station of the United States Central Intelligence Agency has attended the JIC's weekly meetings. One former US intelligence officer has described this as the "highlight of the job" for the London CIA chief. Resident intelligence chiefs from Australia, Canada, and New Zealand may attend when certain issues are discussed.

== Chairs of the Joint Intelligence Committee ==
Since founding, the committee's Chair has been as follows:

- Sir Ralph Stevenson, 1936–1939
- Victor Cavendish-Bentinck, 1939–1945 (subsequently the 9th Duke of Portland)
- Sir Harold Caccia, 1945–1948 (subsequently the Lord Caccia)
- Sir William Hayter, 1948–1949
- Sir Patrick Reilly, 1950–1953
- Sir Patrick Dean, 1953–1960
- Sir Hugh Stephenson, 1960–1963
- Sir Bernard Burrows, 1963–1966
- Sir Denis Greenhill, 1966–1968 (subsequently the Lord Greenhill)
- Sir Edward Peck, 1968–1970
- Sir Stewart Crawford, 1970–1973
- Sir Geoffrey Arthur, 1973–1975
- Sir Antony Duff, 1975–1979
- Sir Antony Acland, 1979–1982
- Sir Patrick Wright, 1982–1984 (subsequently the Lord Wright)
- Sir Percy Craddock, 1985–1992
- Sir Rodric Braithwaite, 1992–1993
- Dame Pauline Neville-Jones, 1993–1994 (subsequently Baroness Neville-Jones)
- Sir Paul Lever, 1994–1996
- Sir Colin Budd, 1996–1997
- Sir Michael Pakenham, 1997–2000
- Sir Peter Ricketts, 2000 – September 2001
- Sir John Scarlett, 2001–2004
- Sir William Ehrman, 2004–2005
- Sir Richard Mottram, 2005–2007 (as Permanent Secretary, Intelligence, Security and Resilience)
- Sir Alex Allan, 2007–2011
- Sir Jon Day, 2012–2015
- Sir Charles Farr, 2015–2019
- Sir Simon Gass, 2019–2023
- Dame Madeleine Alessandri, 2023–2026
- Adrian Bird, from 3 July 2026

== See also ==
- British intelligence agencies
- Joint Intelligence Organisation
- Intelligence and Security Committee of Parliament
- United States Intelligence Community
  - National Intelligence Council
  - Joint Intelligence Community Council
  - United States Director of National Intelligence
- Australian Intelligence Community
  - Office of National Intelligence
  - Office of National Assessments
- National Centre for Counter Terrorism, France
