= Adrian Bird (civil servant) =

UK civil servant

Adrian Bird CB
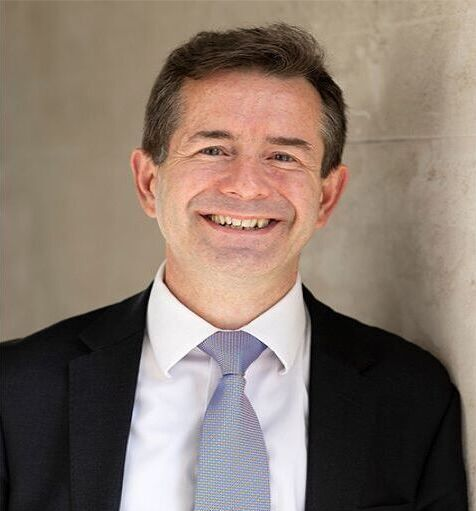
- Bird in 2022

Chair of the Joint Intelligence Committee
- Incumbent
- Assumed office 3 July 2026
- Prime Minister: Andy Burnham
- Preceded by: Dame Madeleine Alessandri

Head of the Joint Intelligence Organisation
- Incumbent
- Assumed office 3 July 2026
- Minister: Louise Haigh
- Cabinet Secretary: Dame Antonia Romeo
- Preceded by: Dame Madeleine Alessandri

Chief of Defence Intelligence
- In office 2022 – 2 July 2026
- Preceded by: Sir James Hockenhull
- Succeeded by: Matthew Jones

Adrian Philip Bird CB is a senior civil servant who has served as Chief of Defence Intelligence at the UK Ministry of Defence. He is currently Chair of the Joint Intelligence Committee.

== Biography ==
Bird joined GCHQ and served in a variety of roles there, latterly as a director-general, before being appointed Chief of Defence Intelligence at the Ministry of Defence in September 2022.

In December 2025, Bird disclosed that there had been a 50% increase in threats identified over the previous year.

In the 2022 New Year Honours, Bird was appointed Companion of the Order of the Bath (CB) "for services to British foreign policy".

He took over as Chair of the Joint Intelligence Committee in July 2026, succeeding Dame Madeleine Alessandri.

Military offices
Preceded by James Hockenhull	Chief of Defence Intelligence; 2022–2026	Succeeded by Matthew Jones
Preceded by Dame Madeleine Alessandri	Chair of the Joint Intelligence Committee; 3 July 2026 – present	Incumbent
