= Commander Cyber & Specialist Operations Command =

Commander of Cyber & Specialist Operations Command
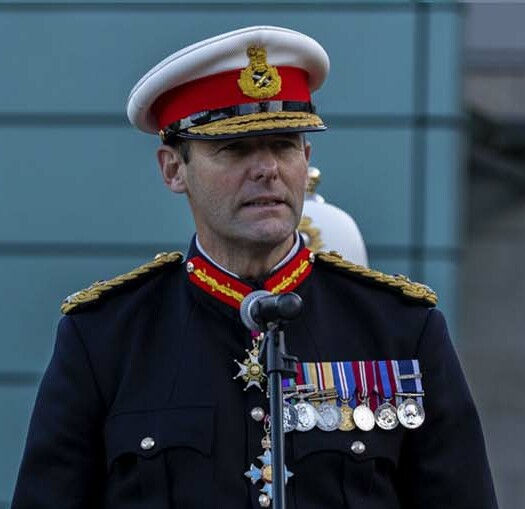
- Incumbent; General Sir Robert Magowan since March 2026
- Ministry of Defence; Cyber & Specialist Operations Command
- Type: Four-star officer
- Status: Chief of Joint Forces
- Member of: Defence Council; Chiefs of Staff Committee
- Reports to: Chief of the Defence Staff
- Nominator: Secretary of State for Defence
- Appointer: Prime Minister (subject to formal approval by the King-in-Council)
- Formation: April 2012 (as Commander, Joint Forces Command); December 2019 (as Commander, Strategic Command); September 2025 (as Commander, Cyber & Specialist Operations Command)
- First holder: Air Chief Marshal Stuart Peach
- Deputy: Deputy Commander, Cyber & Specialist Operations Command

Commander of Cyber & Specialist Operations Command is a high-ranking position in the British Armed Forces, usually held by a four-star officer. The commander is the head of Cyber & Specialist Operations Command, which manages allocated joint capabilities from the three armed services.

== Responsibilities ==
Cyber & Specialist Operations Command develops and coordinates joint capabilities for UK Defence, such as medical services, intelligence, support and logistics, digital and communication systems, cyber, special forces, training and education, and UK overseas bases. It also manages overseas military operations through the Permanent Joint Headquarters.

== Commanders ==
No.	Portrait	Commander	Took office	Left office	Time in office	Defence branch	Ref.
1	Sir Stuart Peach	Air Chief Marshal; Sir Stuart Peach (born 1956)	December 2011	April 2013	1 year, 4 months	Royal Air Force	
2	Sir Richard Barrons	General; Sir Richard Barrons (born 1959)	April 2013	April 2016	3 years	British Army	
3	Sir Christopher Deverell	General; Sir Christopher Deverell (born 1955)	April 2016	May 2019	3 years, 1 month	British Army	
4	Sir Patrick Sanders	General; Sir Patrick Sanders (born 1966)	May 2019	May 2022	3 years	British Army	
5	Sir James Hockenhull	General; Sir James Hockenhull (born 1964)	May 2022	March 2026	4 years, 4 months	British Army	
6	Sir Robert Magowan	General; Sir Robert Magowan (born 1967)	March 2026	Incumbent	6 months	Royal Marines	
