= 4 Military Intelligence Battalion (United Kingdom) =

4th Military Intelligence Battalion
- 4 MI Bn
- Active: post 2000–Present
- Country: United Kingdom
- Branch: British Army
- Size: Battalion
- Battalion HQ: Ward Barracks, Bulford Camp
- Engagements: Operation Telic; Operation Herrick

Insignia
- Battalion badge

The 4th Military Intelligence Battalion (4 MI Bn) is a military intelligence unit of the British Army's Intelligence Corps, which provides close intelligence support to the headquarters for the only warfighting division in the army.

== History ==
The 1999 Staff Officer's Handbook mentions 1st and 2nd Military Intelligence Battalions based in Germany and United Kingdom respectively. The 3rd (V) MI Battalion also appears here, however a 4th MI Bn is not mentioned. Therefore, it can be reasonably assumed the battalion was formed between 2000 and 2008 (when 5 Bn was formed). By 2007, the battalion appears as part of 1st Military Intelligence Brigade.

Under the Army 2020 programme announced in 2013, the battalion left the disbanding 1 MI Bde to join the new 1st Intelligence and Surveillance Brigade along with the other 4 battalions of the Intelligence Corps (1–3 and 5). In addition, the battalion moved to its current location at Ward Barracks, Bulford Camp.

As part of the programme, the corps' reserve component was expanded. Therefore, in 2015 7 Military Intelligence Battalion was formed with its headquarters in Bristol, based on 54 Military Intelligence Coy, 5 MI Bn. This new battalion was placed under 1 IS Bde and paired with 4 MI Bn shortly thereafter.

== Role ==
The 4th Military Intelligence Battalion (4 MI Bn) is the largest concentration of Intelligence Corps (Int Corps) personnel in the Army, focused on supporting the 3rd (United Kingdom) Division. 4 MI Bn is a regular army unit, which sits under the 1st Intelligence, Surveillance and Reconnaissance Brigade. It is tasked with supporting 3 UK Div including its new armoured infantry and strike brigades. The current battalion is split between Bulford Camp and Aldershot Garrison.

Though supporting 3 (UK) Division is the battalion's primary role, it also provides MI support to London District, Southern England, and British Army Germany.

The battalion also oversees small intelligence sections at Bovington Camp, and until 2017, C Company was based Antwerp Barracks, Paderborn Garrison.

== Structure ==
Following the Army 2020 Refine, the battalion was reorganised into three multi-functional companies, a headquarters, a logistic support section, and a new 'Operations Support MI Company'.

- Battalion Headquarters
- Headquarters Company
- 41 Military Intelligence Company — (below organisation is standard throughout the companies)
  - Company Headquarters
  - Close Support (CS) Intelligence Section
  - General Support (GS) Intelligence Section
  - Battle Group Intelligence Support Section (BGISS)
  - Counter Intelligence and Security (CI&Sy) Section
- 42 Military Intelligence Company —
- 43 Military Intelligence Company —
- Operations Support Military Intelligence Company
- Logistic Support Section, at Aldershot Garrison — supporting 101st Operational Sustainment Brigade
