= Julian Buczacki =

British Army officer

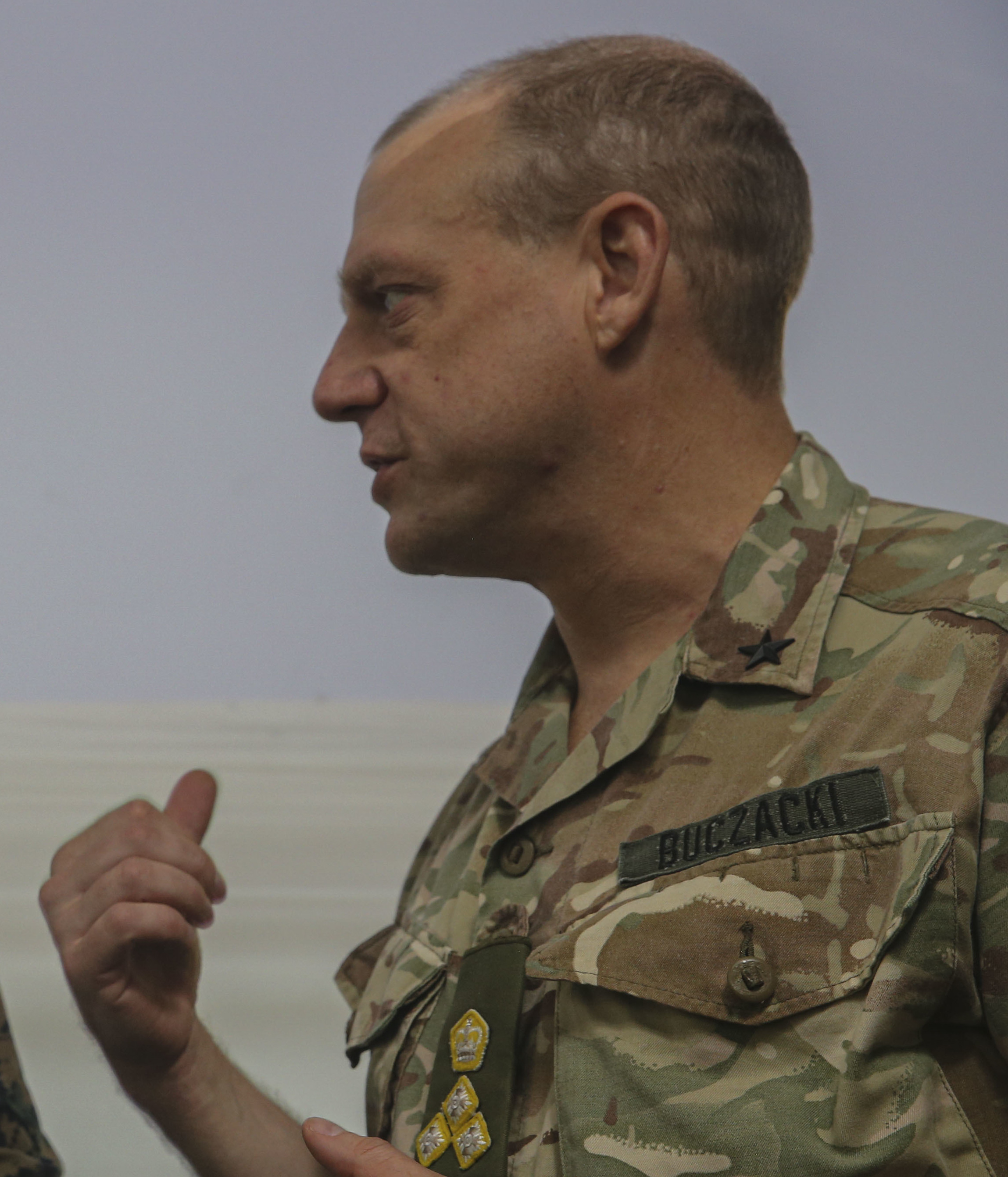
Brigadier Jules Buczacki, 2019

Major General Julian Nicholas Edward "Jules" Buczacki (born 10 November 1973) is a senior British Army officer. He served as commander of the 1st Intelligence, Surveillance and Reconnaissance Brigade from 2018 to 2020, and as Assistant Chief of Defence Staff (Military Strategy) from 2022 to 2025. He commissioned in the King's Royal Hussars in 1997, and went on to become the final commanding officer of the Queen's Royal Lancers from 2013 to 2015.
