= Philip Osborn =

Royal Air Force officer

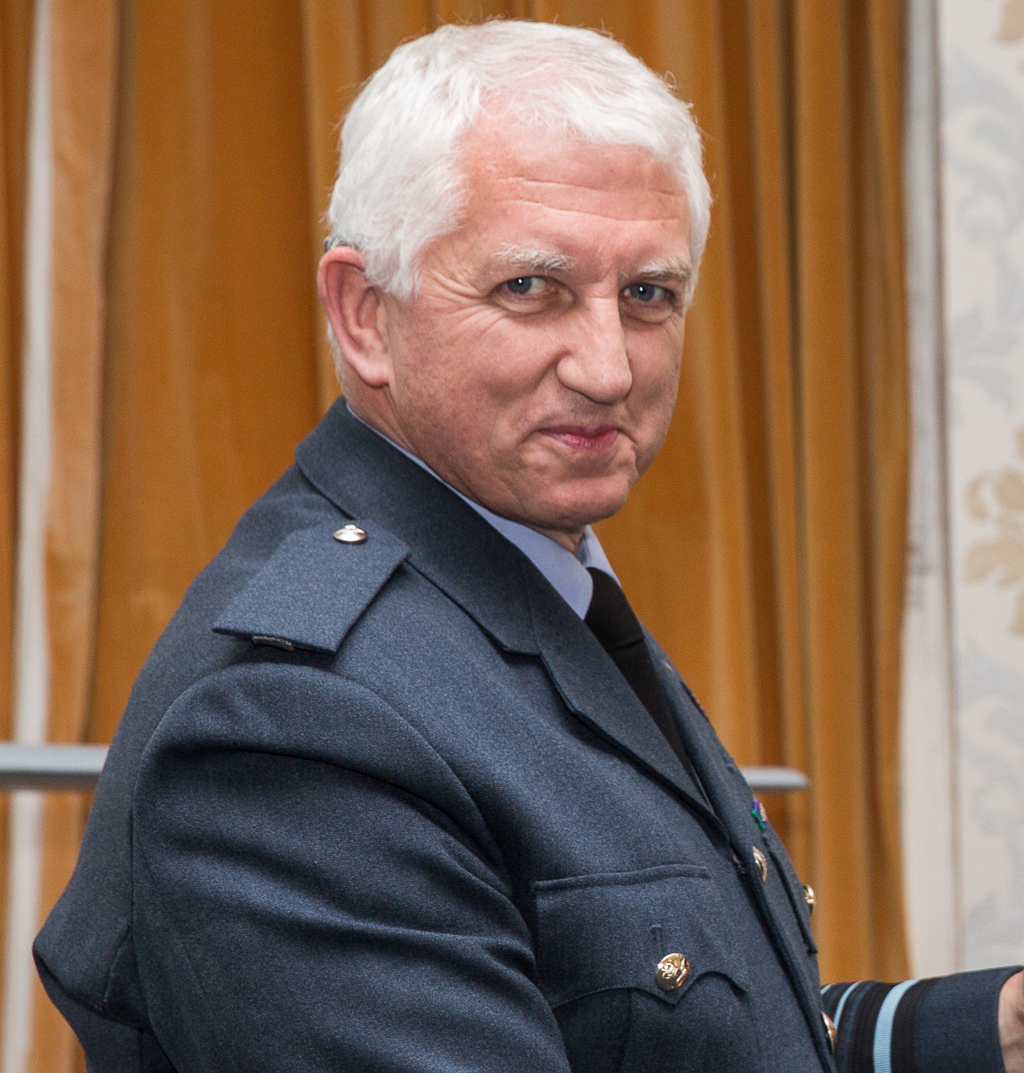
- Air Marshal Osborn in 2019
- Military career
- Allegiance: United Kingdom
- Branch: Royal Air Force
- Service years: 1982–2019
- Rank: Air Marshal
- Commands: No. 2 Group; RAF Marham; No. 13 Squadron
- Conflicts: Iraq War
- Awards: Commander of the Order of the British Empire

Air Marshal Philip Colin Osborn, CBE, FRAeS is a senior Royal Air Force officer who served as Chief of Defence Intelligence from 2015 to 2018.

== RAF career ==
Osborn joined the Royal Air Force in 1982. After training as a Tornado navigator, he became commanding officer of No. 13 Squadron and then Station Commander at RAF Marham. He went on to be Air Officer Commanding No. 2 Group in October 2010, Chief of Staff Operations and Support at RAF Air Command in 2012 and Director Capability at Joint Forces Command in 2013. He became Chief of Defence Intelligence in January 2015.

Osborn was appointed a Commander of the Order of the British Empire in the 2009 New Year Honours. He is a Fellow of the Royal Aeronautical Society (FRAeS).

Osborn officially retired from the Royal Air Force on 13 October 2019.

== Later life ==
In retirement, Osborn maintained links with the Royal Air Force and became chairman of the RAF Charitable Trust in June 2020, and became a non-executive director for Lincolnshire-based defence company, Inzpire, in April 2020.

Military offices
Preceded by Stephen Hillier	Air Officer Commanding No. 2 Group; 2010–2012	Succeeded by Sean Reynolds
Preceded by Alan Richards	Chief of Defence Intelligence; 2015–2018	Succeeded by James Hockenhull
