= Communications data =

Communications data (sometimes referred to as traffic data or metadata) concerns information about communication.

Communications data is a part of a message that should be distinguished from the content of the message. It contains data on the communication's origin, destination, route, time, date, size, duration, or type of underlying service.

== See also ==
- Call detail record
- Internet Protocol Detail Record
- Pen Register
- Data Retention Directive
- Interception Modernization Programme
- Mastering the Internet
- NSA Call Database
- CSE and Communications data
- Titan traffic database
