= 5 Military Intelligence Battalion =

British military organization

- 5 MI Bn
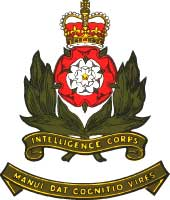
- Intelligence Corps badge
- Active: 2008–present
- Country: United Kingdom
- Branch: British Army
- Role: Military intelligence (MI)
- Size: Battalion
- Part of: 1st (United Kingdom) Division
- Garrison/HQ: Edinburgh
- Mottos: Qui stant exspectantque etiam serviunt (Latin: "They also serve who stand and wait") (Note: From John Milton's poem "When I consider how my light is spent")

5 Military Intelligence Battalion (5 MI Bn) is an Intelligence Corps Army Reserve unit in the British Army. It is based in Scotland, with sub-units in Edinburgh, Gateshead and Leeds and detachments in Glasgow and Chesterfield. It is partnered with 1 Military Intelligence Battalion, a Regular Army unit based in Catterick Garrison, North Yorkshire.

== Role and organisation ==
=== Current role ===
5 MI Bn provides military intelligence support to the Regular British Army with personnel trained in operational intelligence and Open Source Intelligence (OSINT). 5MI are a part of the 1st (UK) Division, having formerly been in the Intelligence, Surveillance and Reconnaissance Group.

=== Training ===
Personnel attend weekly training evenings and monthly weekend training to develop their skills as soldiers and intelligence operators. This includes training in fieldcraft and military skills, analytical and intelligence techniques, leadership, and adventurous training. The unit also conducts annual collective training either in the UK or the United States, normally in partnership with 2nd Intelligence Battalion USMC.

=== Organisation ===
The current organisation of the battalion, following the Army 2020 Refine, as of 2021 is as follows:

- Battalion Headquarters and Headquarters Company, at Redford Barracks, Edinburgh
- 51 Military Intelligence Company, in Edinburgh and Glasgow
- 52 Military Intelligence Company, in Gateshead
- 53 Military Intelligence Company, at Carlton Barracks, Leeds and Chesterfield
- 54 Military Intelligence Company, at Lisburn

== History ==
=== Post-war origins: 1945-1963 ===
5 MI Bn traces its direct history to the end of the Second World War and start of the Cold War era.

Following the end of the Second World War, the British Army reduced the size of the regular Intelligence Corps as the need for military intelligence reduced. By 1947, this meant that Intelligence Corps personnel in the Territorial Army (TA) outnumbered Regular personnel.

The Intelligence Corps TA was formed around the regional Land Command Headquarters, providing direct Field Security (FS) intelligence support to military formations and UK-based units.

Many of these TA units were gradually disbanded during the post-war draw down. A parallel Intelligence Corps unit with historic links to WW2, the Ports and Travel Security Group (P&TSG) was formed from the some of these units, to provide security to UK ports and overseas military movements. At its height, the P&TSG comprised over 1,000 personnel.

=== Restructuring: 1963-1967 ===
In 1963, further restructuring of the FS TA units, saw the formation of the UK Intelligence Unit (TA), a national organisation headquartered in Hounslow, London, providing direct counterintelligence (CI) support to Home Defence and the British Army of the Rhine (BAOR) in Germany.

The post-war period saw further advances in Human Intelligence (HUMINT) and Photographic Interpretation (PI).

The HUMINT organisations were initially staffed by Intelligence Corps TA personnel in the IS (Intelligence School) 9 (TA), formed on 1 May 1947 from wartime members of MI9 (Escapers & Evaders) and MI19 (Debriefing of Prisoners of War). IS 9 (TA) eventually became The Joint Services Interrogation Unit (JSIU) (TA), which in turn became 22 Interrogation Company (Volunteers) in 1967.

The Cold War TA PI specialism was initially provided by the Intelligence Corps TA in the Army Photographic Interpretation Unit (APIU) in Borers Wood, London, the Army Photographic Interpretation Centre (APIC) at RAF Wilton and latterly with the Joint Air Reconnaissance Intelligence Centre (JARIC) at RAF Brampton. In 1967, several Intelligence Corps TA elements merged to form 21 Photographic Interpretation Company (V), later to become 21 Int Company (V).

On 1 April 1967, the TA Intelligence & Security Group (V) was formed to provide direct support to the BAOR. The initial establishment included a national unit, 20 Security Company (V), which used Intelligence Corps TA drill halls in the UK. It also included London-based 21 PI Company (V) and 22 Interrogation Company (V), headquartered in London TA Centre Artillery House (later renamed Ashford House) in Hackney, London.

=== Modernisation: 1967-2008 ===
On 1 April 1999, the TA Intelligence & Security Group (V) was renamed 3 MI Bn (V), with its headquarters in Worship Street, London. It maintained sub-units in Worship Street, Hampstead, Birmingham, Edinburgh, Bristol, and York with detachments in Exeter, Cardiff, Gateshead, Belfast and Chorley.

This period saw personnel deploying in support of operations in the Falklands War (Op CORPORATE), First Gulf War (Op GRANBY) and in support to the United Nations (Op GRAPPLE) and NATO operations in Bosnia (Op RESOLUTE, Op LODESTAR and Op PALATINE) and Kosovo (Op AGRICOLA).

After the 11 September attacks on the World Trade Centre in 2001, 53 volunteers from 3 MI Bn (V) were mobilised in support of the war on terror (Op VERITAS). They were employed in a variety of strategic and operational locations, with a large contingent serving in Defence Intelligence in Whitehall, London. Deployments to locations such as Sierra Leone (Op SILKMAN), Iraq (Op TELIC), Afghanistan (Op HERRICK), Bosnia (Op ALTHEA) and Kosovo (Op AGRICOLA) soon followed.

Since the end of Op HERRICK in Afghanistan in 2015, 5 MI Bn personnel have continued to support operations around the world, including deployments to Afghanistan (Op TORAL) and Estonia (Op CABRIT).

=== Formation: 2008-2014 ===
5 Military Intelligence Battalion (Volunteers), was formed at Queen Elizabeth II Barracks, Strensall on 1 April 2008.

The new establishment consisted of:

- Headquarters – Hollis VC Armoury, Coulby Newham on Teesside.
  - 51 MI Company (originally 22 Interrogation Company) based out of Hampstead, London.
  - 52 MI Company in Edinburgh with a detachment in Lisburn.
  - 53 MI Company in York with a detachment in Gateshead.
  - 54 MI Company in Keynsham (Bristol) with detachments in Exeter and Newport.
  - 55 MI Company in Stourbridge (Birmingham) with detachments in Chorley and Nottingham.

Due to its proximity to London, 51 MI Company reverted to 3 MI Bn (V) in 2009. This now saw 3 MI Bn (V) firmly centred in London, with 5 MI Bn (V) covering the remainder of the UK.

=== Reorganisation: 2014-2018 ===
In 2014, 5 MI Bn was further divided into three separate battalions covering different parts of the UK.

- 52 MI Coy Lisburn detachment expanded and become 62 MI Coy.
- 54 MI Coy became 71 MI Coy, with 7 MI Bn HQ located in Bristol.
- 55 MI Coy became 63 MI Coy, with 6 MI Bn HQ located in Manchester.

=== Current situation: 2018-present ===
Recently, however, there are now 4 companies that make up 5MI. Lisburn, which was formerly 62 MI Coy, was merged back in with 5 MI.

- 51 MI Coy in Edinburgh, with a detachment in Glasgow.
- 52 MI Coy in Gateshead.
- 53 MI Coy in Leeds, with a detachment in Chesterfield, moving from Nottingham in November 2018.
- 54 MI Coy in Lisburn, NI.

Under the British Army Future Soldier 2030 plans, 5MI were reorganised into supporting the 1st (UK) Division, having formerly been in the Intelligence, Surveillance and Reconnaissance Group. They support the regular 1MI Battalion in their current operational commitments.

== Affiliations ==
- 1st Military Intelligence Battalion
- 2nd Intelligence Battalion (USMC)

== See also ==
- Intelligence Corps
- 1st Intelligence, Surveillance and Reconnaissance Brigade
- 1st (United Kingdom) Division
