= School of Service Intelligence =

Military installation in Ashford, Kent, England

- Ashford, Kent
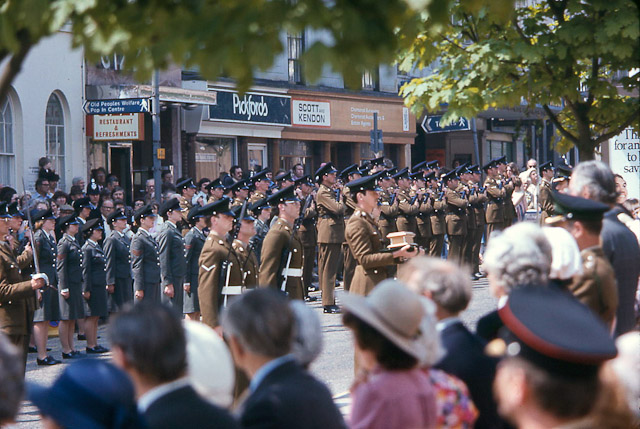
- Troops from the school on parade in Ashford in May 1979

Site information
- Type: Training school
- Owner: Ministry of Defence
- Operator: British Army

Location
- Location within Kent
- Coordinates: 51.1559°N 0.8562°E

Site history
- Built: 1966
- Built for: Ministry of Defence
- In use: 1966–1997

The School of Service Intelligence (SSI) was formed by adding Royal Navy and Royal Air Force elements to the former School of Military Intelligence. It was based at Templer Barracks in Ashford, Kent, United Kingdom alongside the Headquarters and Depot of the British Army's Intelligence Corps and the Joint Service Interrogation Wing.

== History ==
The school was established as the School of Military Intelligence (SMI) at Templer Barracks in Ashford in 1966. It then became tri-service as the School of Service Intelligence (SSI) in 1969.

The SSI provided training to all elements of the British Armed Forces, civilian authorities and international partners, although Intelligence Corps recruit and trade training was carried out by the Depot. The SSI was later renamed the Defence Intelligence and Security School (DISS). In 1997, following the closure of Templer Barracks as a result of work on the Channel Tunnel Rail Link, the DISS and other elements were relocated to the Defence Intelligence and Security Centre, at Chicksands near Shefford, Bedfordshire.

The Barracks have now been demolished with the exception of Repton Manor, a Grade II listed building.

== Training ==
The SSI provided all trade training for regular and Reserve soldiers and junior officers of the Intelligence Corps, preparing personnel for roles in the land warfare environment.
