= HMS Ferret (1794) =

History

Great Britain
- Name: HMS Ferret
- Acquired: 3 February 1794 (by purchase)
- Commissioned: March 1794
- Fate: Sold May 1802

General characteristics
- Type: Hoy
- Tons burthen: 66, or 68 (bm)
- Length: 64 ft 1 in (19.5 m) (overall); 57 ft 5 1/8 in (17.5 m) (keel)
- Beam: 14 ft 6 3/4 in (4.4 m)
- Depth of hold: 6 ft 5 in (1.96 m)
- Propulsion: Sails
- Sail plan: sloop
- Complement: 30
- Armament: 1 × 24-pounder gun + 3 × 32-pounder carronades

HMS Ferret was a Dutch hoy that the Admiralty purchased in 1794 for use as a gun-boat. It sold her in May 1802.

Ferret was commissioned into the Royal Navy in March 1794 under Lieutenant John Tucker for the Nore. In September Lieutenant James Boorder replaced Tucker. Lieutenant John Macredie replaced Boorder in June 1795 at Sheerness, but paid her off in February 1796.

In March Ferret was transferred to the newly established Transport Board. In September Ferret returned to the Navy and was recommissioned under Lieutenant Nathaniel Stewart. Lieutenant Archibald Meheux replaced Stewart in November 1798

The "Principal Officers and Commissioners of the Navy" offered "Ferret Gun-Vessel, 68 Tons, lying at Portsmouth" for sale on 12 May 1802. Ferret sold in May 1802.
