= Communications Data Bill 2008 =

The Communications Data Bill was intended to create powers to collect data concerning people's phone, e-mail and web-browsing habits for mass surveillance in the United Kingdom. The government database would have included telephone numbers dialed, the websites visited and addresses to which e-mails are sent but not the text of e-mails or recorded telephone conversations.

Since October 2007 telecommunication companies have been required to keep records of phone calls and text messages for twelve months. The bill would have extended the coverage to Internet website visited, email messages, and VOIP data.

Chris Huhne, Liberal Democrat Home affairs spokesman said at the time: "The government's Orwellian plans for a vast database of our private communications are deeply worrying."

The plans were not completed during the Labour administration, but intentions to gain access to more communications data lived on under the coalition elected in 2010 as the Communications Capabilities Development Programme run by the Home Office's Office for Security and Counter-Terrorism. In 2012, a new Draft Communications Data Bill was published.

== Political and civil liberties response ==
The 2012 draft Communications Data Bill faced significant criticism from civil liberties groups and members of the governing coalition, particularly the Liberal Democrats, who argued that it granted overly broad surveillance powers. Parliamentary committees, including the Joint Committee on the Draft Communications Data Bill, expressed concerns about the scope of the powers, the proportionality of data collection, and the strength of safeguards. The committees recommended substantial revisions. Due to this opposition and tensions within the coalition, the bill was excluded from the government's final legislative programme and was not enacted.

== See also ==
- Interception Modernisation Programme
- Mass surveillance in the United Kingdom
