= MOD Chicksands =

British Armed Forces facility in Bedfordshire, England

- Near Shefford, Bedfordshire in England
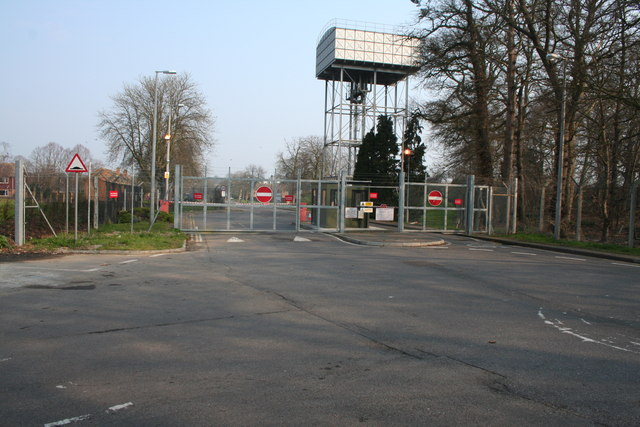
- An entrance to MOD Chicksands

Site information
- Type: Military intelligence centre
- Owner: Ministry of Defence
- Operator: Strategic Command
- Controlled by: Defence Intelligence
- Condition: Operational

Location
- Location in Bedfordshire
- Coordinates: 52.04251°N 0.36258°W
- Area: 172 hectares (430 acres)

Site history
- Built: 1936
- In use: 1936–1950 (Royal Air Force); 1950–1996 (US Air Force); 1997 – unknown (British Army)

Garrison information
- Occupants: Intelligence Corps; Defence Intelligence Training Group

Ministry of Defence Chicksands, or more simply MOD Chicksands, is a tri-service British Armed Forces facility in Bedfordshire, approximately 35 miles (56 km) north of London. It is named after Chicksands Priory, a 12th-century Gilbertine monastery located within the perimeter of the camp.

The site was formerly RAF Chicksands, which closed in 1997, handing over control of the site to the British Army. Today, the Defence Intelligence Training Group (DITG) is based at MOD Chicksands, and is the Headquarters of the Intelligence Corps.

The base will close and be disposed of in 2031.

== Site history ==
=== RAF Chicksands ===
The Crown Commissioners bought the Chicksands estate on 15 April 1936, later renting it to Gerald Bagshawe, who lived there until it was requisitioned by the Royal Navy. After nine months the RAF took over operations and established a signal intelligence collection (SIGINT) unit there, known as a Y Station.

The site operated as a SIGINT collection site throughout the Second World War, intercepting German traffic and passing the resulting material to the Government Code and Cypher School at Bletchley Park, where ciphers and codes of several Axis countries were decrypted, most importantly the ciphers generated by the German Enigma and Lorenz machines.

=== United States Air Force Europe ===
In 1950 the site was subleased to the United States Air Force serving as the base of the 6940th Radio Squadron, responsible for continued communications and SIGINT operation through the Cold War. The RAF continued to act as a host unit for the resident USAF units, including over time the 6950th United States Air Force Security Squadron, later becoming the 6950th Electronic Security Group and the 7274th Air Base Group.

In 1962, a 1,443 feet (440 m) diameter AN/FLR-9 Wullenweber antenna array was constructed at Chicksands to form part of the Iron Horse HF direction finding network. This antenna array, dubbed the Elephant Cage, was dismantled in 1996 when the USAF withdrew from the site, handing it back to the British Armed Forces.

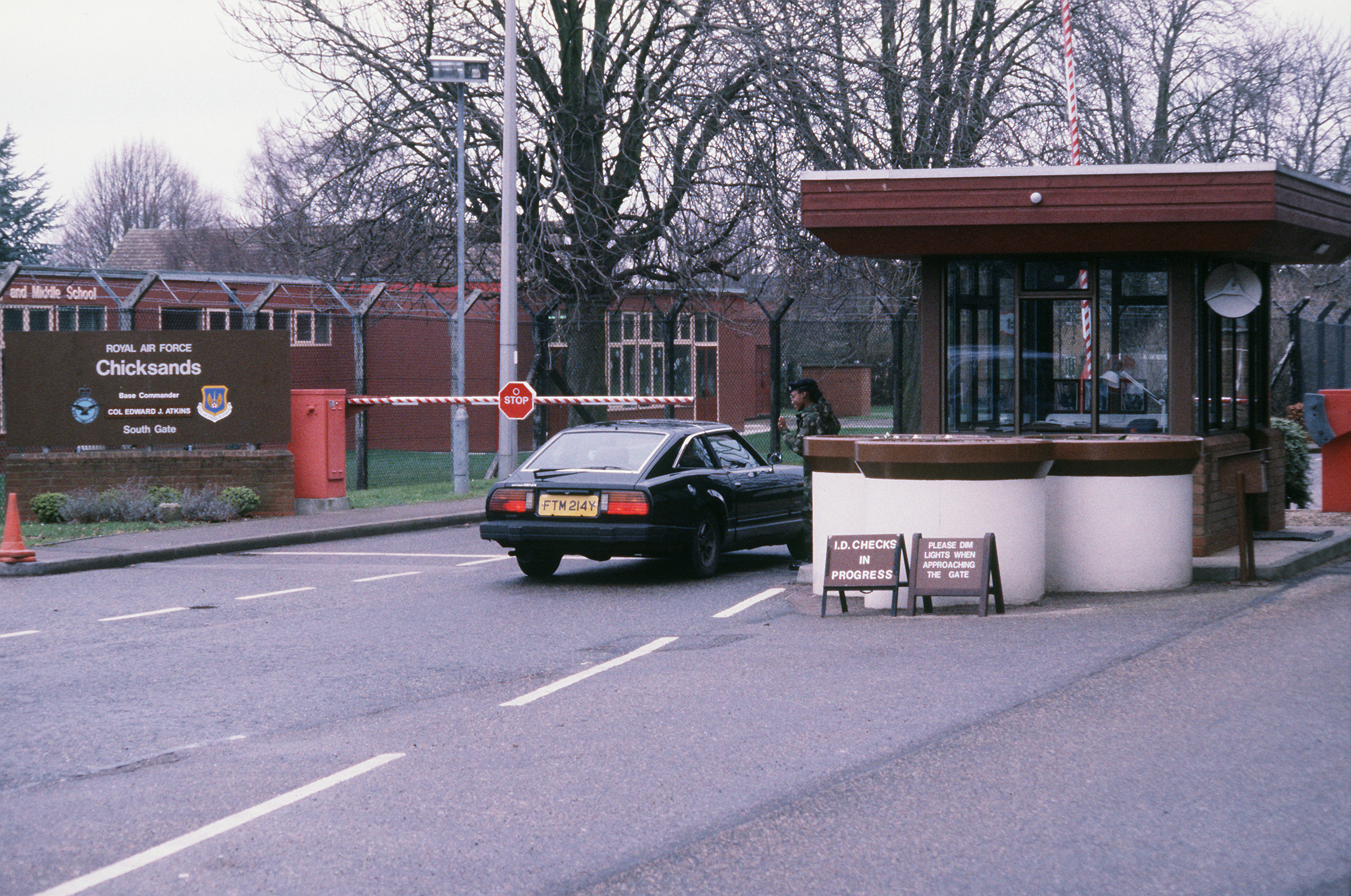
The main gate at RAF Chicksands in 1995, during the tenure of the US Air Force

During an air demonstration on 7 July 1979, Colonel Thomas Thompson piloting a Fairchild Republic A-10 Thunderbolt II crashed approximately 1.5 miles (2.4 km) north of the site and was killed.

=== British Army control ===
In 1997, the Intelligence Corps assumed responsibility for the site, moving the Corps Headquarters from Templer Barracks, Ashford, Kent along with Intelligence Training.

Channel 4's Time Team visited the base in 2001 and excavated areas in front of and around the priory. One of the unusual finds was the remains of a 45-year old woman. The bones were studied and carbon-dated and almost four years after they were unearthed, the bones were re-buried by the military chaplain on the base in August 2005. The Time Team were unsure who the woman was, but they believed her to be a commoner rather than a member of the Gilbertine Order.

In 2003, the Double Agent Alfredo 'Freddie' Scappaticci (codenamed 'Stakeknife') was debriefed at the base when his cover was blown. Scappaticci had been working for the IRA but informing on them to the Ministry of Defence, who were said to have been paying him £80,000 a year.

In April 2004, the former US Elementary School site was sold off to Mid-Bedfordshire Council to enable consolidation of two council offices in Biggleswade and Ampthill. The site was located at the extreme southern end of the base where it backs onto the crossroads on the A507 road by Campton village. The funds raised from this allowed the unit to build new accommodation blocks for officers and other ranks on the base.

== Ministry of Defence use ==
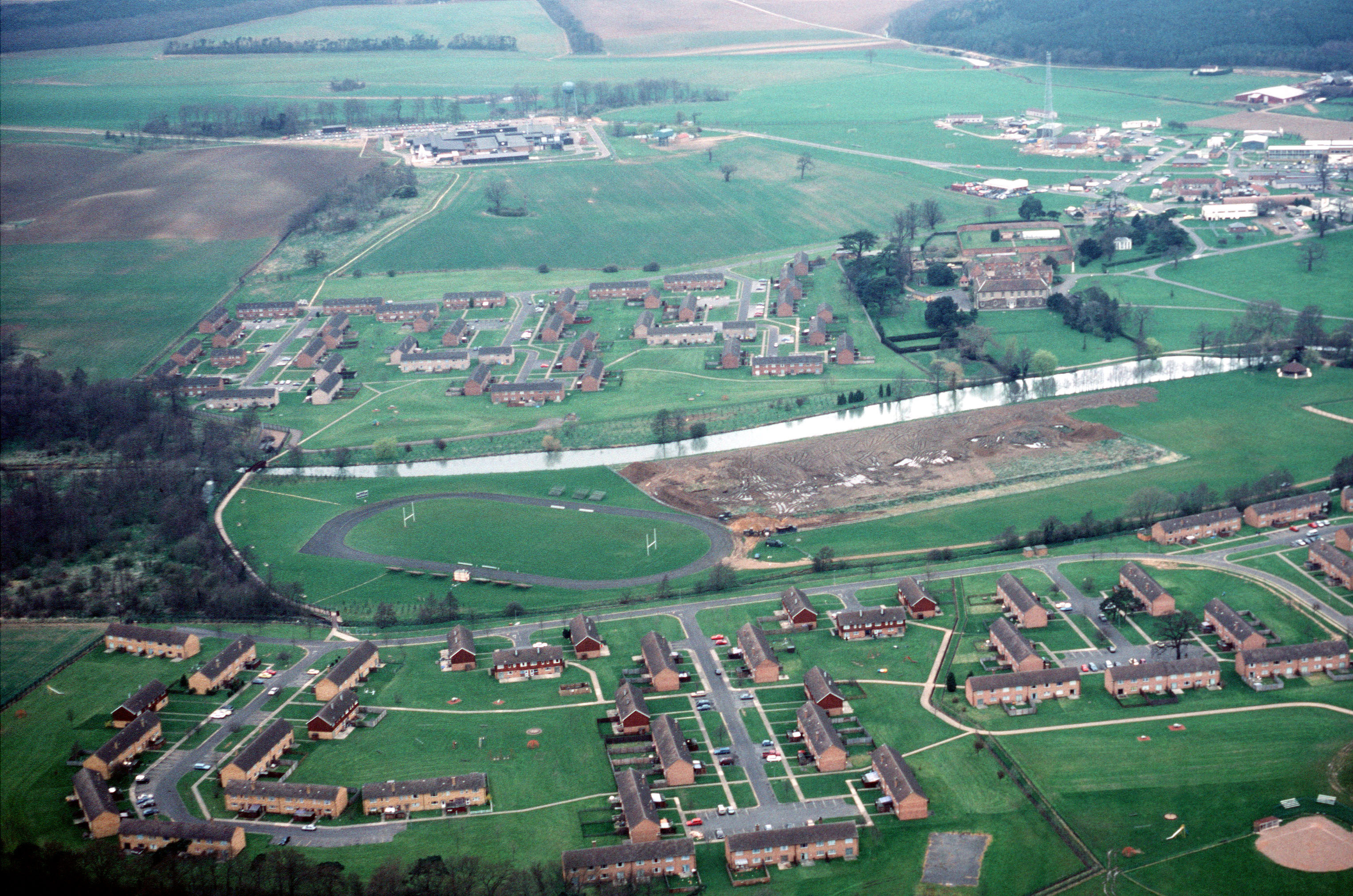
An aerial view of RAF Chicksands during 1989

The Defence College of Intelligence (DCI) is headquartered at Chicksands, and is responsible for delivering training in military intelligence to members of the British Armed Forces, police and other public sector staff as well as international partners. Training is delivered over three sites, Chicksands, the Defence Centre for Languages and Culture, MOD Shrivenham and the Defence School of Photography at RAF Cosford.

DITG trains 5,000 students a year across all disciplines including the Defence Humint Unit and diaspora training sites such as the Defence School of Photography.

The Military Intelligence Museum (formerly Intelligence Corps Museum) is located on site.

=== British Army ===
The Headquarters of the Intelligence Corps is located on site. It is also where Phase 2 training for all Intelligence Corps personnel is undertaken.

The Royal Corps of Signals' Electronic Warfare Operators undertake a five-week aptitude course and a 17-week Communications Exploitation course at the Defence College of Intelligence, Chicksands, as part of their 'Phase 2 Trade Training'.

=== Royal Navy ===
HMS Ferret is a training unit of the Royal Naval Reserve which delivers intelligence-related operational capability.

== See also ==
- List of British Army installations
