= Interception Modernisation Programme =

The Interception Modernisation Programme (IMP) was a UK government initiative to extend the government's capabilities for lawful interception and storage of communications data. It was widely reported that the IMP's eventual goal was to store details of all UK communications data in a central database.

The proposal was similar to the NSA Call Database (MAINWAY) established by GCHQ's American counterpart NSA and the Titan traffic database established by the Swedish National Defence Radio Establishment.

In 2008 plans were being made to collect data on all phone calls, emails, chatroom discussions and web-browsing habits as part of the IMP, thought likely to require the insertion of 'thousands' of black box probes into the country's computer and telephone networks. The proposals were expected to be included in the Communications Data Bill 2008. The "giant database" would include telephone numbers dialled, the websites visited and addresses to which e-mails are sent "but not the content of e-mails or telephone conversations." Chris Huhne, the Liberal Democrat Home affairs spokesman said: "The government's Orwellian plans for a vast database of our private communications are deeply worrying." Despite this, the Home Office denied reports that a prototype of the IMP had already been built.

Reports in April 2009 suggested that the government had changed its public stance to one of using legal measures to compel communications providers to store the data themselves, and making it available for government to access; then Home Secretary Jacqui Smith stated that "there are absolutely no plans for a single central store."

The new plans were thought to involve spending £2bn on paying ISPs to install deep packet inspection equipment within their own networks, and obliging them to perform the cross-correlation and profiling of their users' behaviour themselves, in effect achieving the original goals of the IMP by different means.

A detailed analysis was published by the Policy Engagement Network of the London School of Economics on 16 June 2009. The All Party Privacy Group held a hearing on IMP in the House of Commons on 1 July 2009.

In 2010 the new coalition government apparently revived the IMP in its Strategic Defence and Security Review. The new version of the IMP was known as the Communications Capabilities Development Programme.

== See also ==
- Data Retention Directive
- Mass surveillance in the United Kingdom
- National Identity Register
- Regulation of Investigatory Powers Act 2000
