= Intelligence Corps (United Kingdom) =

Intelligence arm of the British Army

- Badge of the Intelligence Corps
- Active: 1914–1929; 19 July 1940 – present
- Allegiance: United Kingdom
- Branch: British Army
- Role: Military intelligence
- Size: 7 Battalions
- HQ Directorate Intelligence Corps: Chicksands
- Nickname: Int Corps
- Mottos: Manui Dat Cognitio Vires; Knowledge gives strength to the arm
- Beret: Cypress green
- March: "Rose & Laurel" (quick); Purcell's "Trumpet Tune and Ayre" (slow)

Commanders
- Colonel-in-Chief: Anne, Princess Royal
- Colonel Commandant: Major-General Matthew H. Jones

Insignia
- Tactical Recognition Flash

The Intelligence Corps (Int Corps) is a corps of the British Army. It is responsible for gathering, analysing and disseminating military intelligence and also for counter-intelligence and security. The Director of the Intelligence Corps is a brigadier.

== History ==
=== 1814–1914 ===
In the 19th century, British intelligence work was undertaken by the Intelligence Department of the War Office. An important figure was Sir Charles Wilson, a Royal Engineer who successfully pushed for reform of the War Office's treatment of topographical work.

In the early 1900s intelligence gathering was becoming better understood, to the point where a counter-intelligence organisation (MI5) was formed by the Directorate of Military Intelligence (DoMI) under Captain (later Major-General) Vernon Kell; overseas intelligence gathering began in 1912 by MI6 under Royal Navy Commander (later Captain) Mansfield Smith-Cumming.

=== 1914–1929 ===
Although the first proposals to create an intelligence corps came in 1905, the first Intelligence Corps was formed in August 1914 and originally included only officers and their servants. It left for France on 12 August 1914. The Royal Flying Corps was formed to monitor the ground, and provided aerial photographs for the Corps to analyse.

During the Irish War of Independence, Intelligence Corps operatives were used to monitor the Irish Republican Army. On Bloody Sunday (1920) 15 British Military Officers and civilians were shot and killed during multiple attacks in Dublin. Of the 15 killed six were Army Intelligence Officers, two were Courts Martial Officers, one was a senior Staff Officer serving with Irish Command (Brevet Lieut-Colonel Hugh Montgomery), three policemen (all former British military), two civilians (all former British military) and one local civilian. Following the war the Intelligence Corps was gradually scaled down and disbanded entirely in 1929; intelligence matters were left to individual unit officers.

=== Second World War ===
On 19 July 1940 a new Intelligence Corps was created by Army Order 112 and has existed since that time. The Army had been unprepared for collecting intelligence for deployment to France, and the only intelligence had been collected by Lieutenant-Colonel Gerald Templer. The Corps trained operatives to parachute at RAF Ringway; some of these were then dropped over France as part of the Special Operations Executive (SOE). Intelligence Corps officers were involved in forming the highly-effective Long Range Desert Group, and Corps officer Lt Col Peter Clayton was one of the four founders of the Special Air Service (SAS). Around 40 per cent of British Army personnel at Bletchley Park were in the Intelligence Corps.

The Combined Allied Intelligence Corps as it was known in Malta, began recruiting in 1940 following Italy's entry into the war on the side of Germany. Among its many responsibilities in the Mediterranean Theatre were debriefing and interrogation of high-ranking prisoners of war in East Africa following Mussolini's invasion of Abyssinia ("Eldoret" P.O.W. Camp no. 365 being one example), counter-intelligence operations following Operation Husky the Allied invasion of Sicily in August 1943, and implementation of the Allied Screening Commission. The commission was established by Field-Marshal Sir Harold Alexander a few days after the fall of Rome in June 1944 to identify and reimburse Italian civilians who had assisted Allied escapees.

=== Cold War ===
Throughout the Cold War, Intelligence Corps officers and NCOs (with changed insignia) were posted behind the Iron Curtain in East Germany, to join in the intelligence-gathering activities of the British Commanders'-in-Chief Mission to the Soviet Forces in Germany (Brixmis).

=== Northern Ireland ===
Many members of the Intelligence Corps served in Northern Ireland during "the Troubles". Units such as the Military Reaction Force, Special Reconnaissance Unit, Force Research Unit and 14 Intelligence Company contained Corps soldiers and officers.

=== Designation ===
On 1 February 1985 the corps was officially declared an 'Arm' (combat support) instead of a 'Service' (rear support).

== Corps traditions ==
Intelligence Corps personnel wear a distinctive cypress green beret with a cap badge consisting of a union rose (a red rose with a white centre) between two laurel branches and surmounted by a crown. Their motto is Manui Dat Cognitio Vires ("Knowledge gives Strength to the Arm"). The corps' quick march is The Rose & Laurel while its slow march is Henry Purcell's Trumpet Tune & Ayre.

Within the British Army, soldiers of the Intelligence Corps are often referred to as Green Slime, or sometimes simply 'Slime', due to the colour of their beret.

== Locations ==
During the Second World War, the depot of the Intelligence Corps was at Wentworth Woodhouse in South Yorkshire. A new headquarters was established at Maresfield Camp, East Sussex in 1948, before it moved to Templer Barracks at Ashford, Kent in 1966.

The corps moved again in 1997 to MOD Chicksands in Bedfordshire along with the Defence Intelligence and Security Centre (DISC). DISC was renamed as Joint Intelligence Training Group in January 2015.

The Intelligence Corps Museum was created in 1969, and later renamed as the Military Intelligence Museum, now also at Chicksands. Because the museum is on a working military base, it can be visited by appointment only. In 2025 plans were announced to move the museum to the Kingsway tunnels in London.

== Training and promotion ==
The corps has a particularly high proportion of commissioned officers, many of them commissioned from the ranks, and also a high percentage of female members. Non-commissioned personnel join as an Operator Military Intelligence (OPMI) or Operator Military Technical Intelligence (OPTI). They do basic 14-week military training at either the Army Training Centre Pirbright, or the Army Training Regiment, Winchester. OPMI/OPTI soldiers then will complete a 20-week special-to-arm training at Templer Training Delivery Wing, Chicksands, at the end of which they are promoted to Lance Corporal and posted to a battalion.

== Current units ==
Intelligence Corps battalions are under the command of the Intelligence, Surveillance and Reconnaissance Group within Field Army Troops.

- Corps Headquarters, at MOD Chicksands
  - Joint Support Group
  - Specialist Group Military Intelligence (Army Reserve), at Denison Barracks, Hermitage
  - Land Intelligence Fusion Centre, at Denison Barracks, Hermitage
- 1 Military Intelligence Battalion, at Bourlon Barracks, Catterick Garrison
  - Battalion Headquarters and Headquarters Company
  - 11 Military Intelligence Company, supporting both 4 Light Brigade and 7 Light Mechanised Brigade.
  - 14 Military Intelligence Company, at Imphal Barracks, York – supporting 1st (UK) Division
  - 16 Military Intelligence Company, at Merville Barracks, Colchester Garrison – supporting 16 Air Assault Brigade
- 2 Military Intelligence (Exploitation) Battalion, at Trenchard Lines, Upavon
  - Battalion Headquarters and Headquarters Company
  - 21 Military Intelligence Company, at Dalton Barracks, Abingdon-on-Thames
  - 22 Military Intelligence Company
  - 23 Military Intelligence Company, at Thiepval Barracks, Lisburn
  - 24 Military Intelligence Company
  - 25 Military Intelligence Company (Army Reserve), Blighmont Army Reserve Centre at Southampton
- 3 Military Intelligence Battalion (Reserve), in Hackney, London
  - Battalion Headquarters and Headquarters Company, in Hackney, London
  - 31 Military Intelligence Company, in Hackney, London
  - 32 Military Intelligence Company, in Cambridge
  - 33 Military Intelligence Company, in Hampstead, London
  - 34 Military Intelligence Company, in Hampstead, London
- 4 Military Intelligence Battalion, at Ward Barracks, Bulford Camp (Regular Army) – supports 3rd UK Division
  - Battalion Headquarters and Headquarters Company
  - 41 Military Intelligence Company
  - 42 Military Intelligence Company
  - 43 Military Intelligence Company
  - Operations Support Military Intelligence Company
  - Logistic Support Section, at Aldershot Garrison – supporting 101st Logistic Brigade
  - Detachments, at Bovington Camp and in Germany
- 5 Military Intelligence Battalion (Reserve), at Edinburgh Castle, Edinburgh – paired with 1 MI Bn
  - Battalion Headquarters and Headquarters Company, at Edinburgh Castle, Edinburgh
  - 51 Military Intelligence Company, in Edinburgh
    - Detachment in Glasgow
  - 52 Military Intelligence Company, at Napier Armoury, Gateshead
  - 53 Military Intelligence Company, at Carlton Barracks, Leeds
    - Detachment, at Wallis Barracks, Chesterfield
- 6 Military Intelligence Battalion (Reserve), in Manchester – paired with 2 MI Bn
  - Battalion Headquarters and Headquarters Company, in Manchester
  - 61 Military Intelligence Company, in Manchester
  - 62 Military Intelligence Company, at Thiepval Barracks, Lisburn
    - Manx Detachment in Douglas, Isle of Man
  - 63 Military Intelligence Company, in Stourbridge
    - Detachment in Bletchley
- 7 Military Intelligence Battalion (Reserve), in Bristol – paired with 4 MI Bn
  - Battalion Headquarters and Headquarters Company, in Bristol
  - 71 Military Intelligence Company, in Bristol
    - 715 Military Intelligence Section, at Wyvern Barracks, Exeter
  - 72 Military Intelligence Company, in Bristol
  - 73 Military Intelligence Company, at Denison Barracks, Hermitage
  - 74 Military Intelligence Company, at Raglan Barracks, Newport

=== Defence Intelligence Training Group, at Chicksands ===
- Army Element

== Notable personnel ==
- Category:Intelligence Corps officers

Colonel Commandants

- 2014–2026: General Sir James Hockenhull
- 2026–present: Major-General Matthew H. Jones

== Works cited ==
- Clayton, Anthony (1996). Forearmed: History of the Intelligence Corps. Brassey's (UK) Ltd. ISBN 978-0080377018.
- Gibson, Steve (2012). Live and Let Spy: Brixmis the Last Cold War Mission. The History Press, Stroud, Glos. ISBN 978-0-7524-6580-7.

== External links and further reading ==
- Official website
- Intelligence Corps Association
- 3 MI Bn (V) – London
- 5 MI Bn – Edinburgh
- Military Intelligence Museum
- The Intelligence Corps in the Second World War The Services 1930 – 1956 at www.BritishMilitaryHistory.co.uk

Preceded by Small Arms School Corps	Order of Precedence	Succeeded by Royal Army Physical Training Corps
