= Communications Capabilities Development Programme =

The Communications Capabilities Development Programme (CCDP) is a UK government initiative to extend the government's capabilities for lawful interception and storage of communications data. It would involve the logging of every telephone call, email and text message between every inhabitant of the UK, (but would not record the actual content of these emails) and is intended to extend beyond the realms of conventional telecommunications media to log communications within social networking platforms such as Twitter and Facebook.

It is an initiative of the Office for Security and Counter-Terrorism at the Home Office, whose Director is Tom Hurd. The office pursued a very similar initiative under the last Labour government, called the Interception Modernisation Programme, which after apparently being cancelled, was revived by the Liberal-Conservative coalition government in their 2010 Strategic Defence and Security Review.

The effort to develop it will be led by a new government organisation, the Communications Capabilities Directorate. In March 2010, it was reported that the Communications Capabilities Directorate had spent over £14m in a single month on set-up costs.

== See also ==
- Anti-terrorism, Crime and Security Act 2001#Part 11 (Retention of communications data)
- Communications Data Bill 2008
- Data retention
- Internet censorship in the United Kingdom
- Mass surveillance in the United Kingdom
- Regulation of Investigatory Powers Act 2000
- Telecommunications data retention#United Kingdom
