= Titan traffic database =

Alleged Swedish Surveillance Database

The Titan traffic database is a database allegedly in use by the Swedish signals intelligence agency, the National Defence Radio Establishment (FRA), according to a news report by Rapport on SVT in June 2008, based on an account from an anonymous source. The source alleged the agency had been storing "massive amounts of information" about "who have been talking to whom, but no content"; leading to a private citizen lodging a complaint with the police. Ultimately, a prosecutor did not launch a full-scale investigation, as it was deemed not illegal at the time.

== See also ==
- Echelon
- MAINWAY
