= Defence Intelligence =

Intelligence agency of the United Kingdom

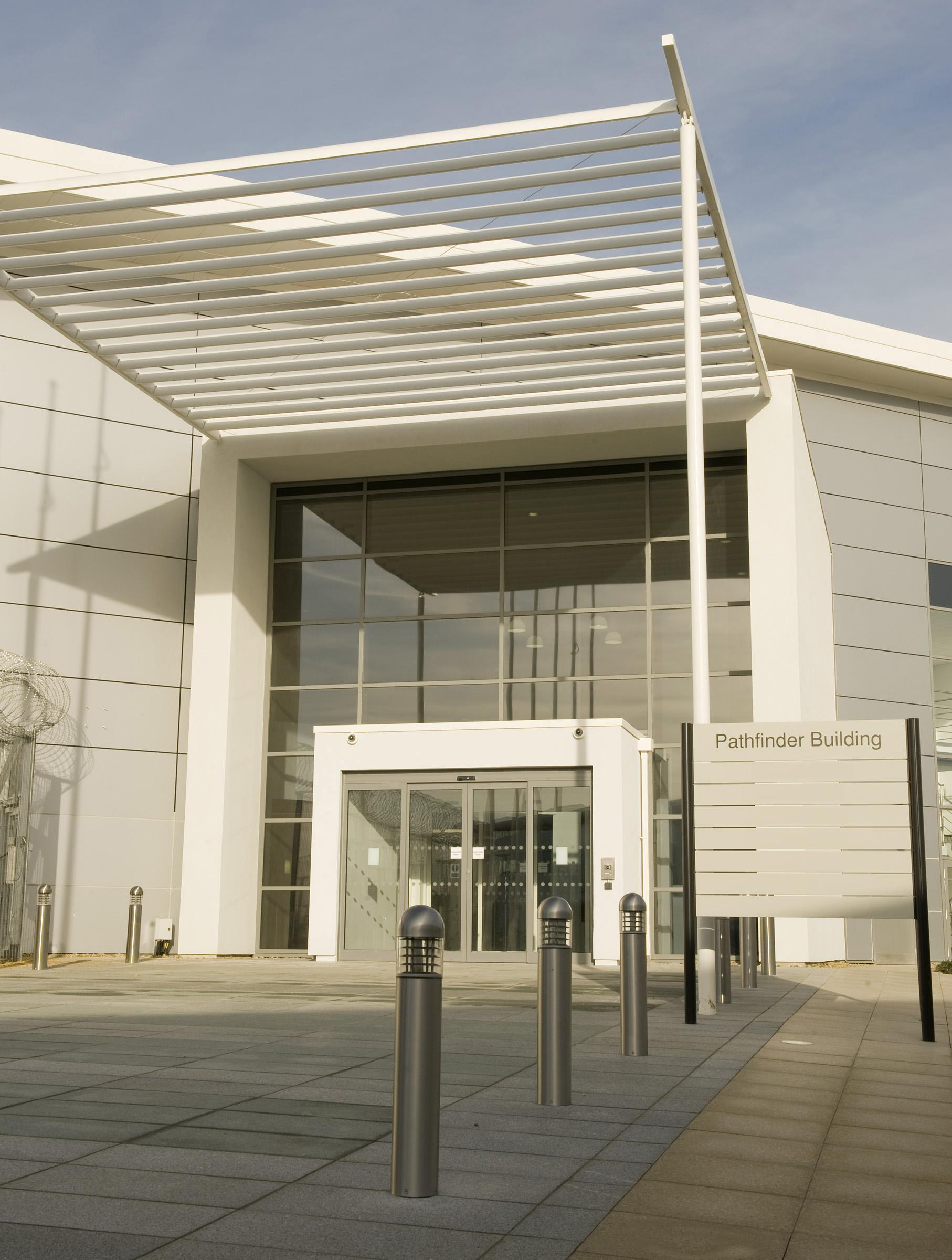
- The Pathfinder Building at RAF Wyton

Organisation overview
- Formed: 1 April 1964 (as Defence Intelligence Staff)
- Preceding agencies: Air Intelligence; Military Intelligence; Naval Intelligence
- Jurisdiction: HM Government
- Headquarters: Ministry of Defence Main Building
- Motto: Quaesitum est scire (To Know Is to Conquer)
- Employees: 5,000
- Minister responsible: Wes Streeting, Secretary of State for Defence
- Organisation executive: Matthew Jones, Chief of Defence Intelligence
- Parent department: Ministry of Defence
- Parent Organisation: Strategic Command
- Website: www.gov.uk/government/groups/defence-intelligence

Defence Intelligence (DI) is an organisation within the United Kingdom intelligence community which focuses on gathering and analysing military intelligence. It differs from the UK's intelligence agencies (MI6, GCHQ and MI5) in that it is an integral part of a government department – the Ministry of Defence (MoD) – rather than a stand-alone organisation. The organisation employs a mixture of civilian and military staff and is funded within the UK's defence budget. The organisation was formerly known as the Defence Intelligence Staff (DIS), but changed its name in 2009.

The primary role of Defence Intelligence is that of 'all-source' intelligence analysis. This discipline draws information from a variety of overt and covert sources to provide the intelligence needed to support military operations, contingency planning, and to inform defence policy and procurement decisions. The maintenance of the ability to give timely strategic warning of politico-military and scientific and technical developments with the potential to affect UK interests is a vital part of the process.

DI's assessments are used outside the MoD to support the work of the Joint Intelligence Committee (JIC) and to assist the work of other Government departments (OGDs) and international partners (such as NATO and the European Union). It is this 'all-source' function which distinguishes Defence Intelligence from other organisations such as SIS and GCHQ, which focus on the collection of 'single-source' Human Intelligence (HUMINT) and Signals Intelligence (SIGINT) respectively. As such Defence Intelligence occupies a unique position within the UK intelligence community.

The organisation is headed by the Chief of Defence Intelligence, currently Lieutenant General Matthew Jones. As of December 2025, it is now part of the wider Military Intelligence Services.

== History ==
=== Origins ===
Defence Intelligence can trace its history back to 1873 with the formation of the Intelligence Branch of the British War Office, which, in 1888, became the Directorate of Military Intelligence. The Committee of Imperial Defence, established in 1902, had the task of co-ordinating the different armed services on issues of military strategy intelligence assessments and estimates.

=== Military Intelligence ===
During World War I (1914–1918), Military Intelligence (MI) departments, such as MI1 for the secretariat of the Director of Military Intelligence (now GCHQ), were responsible for various intelligence gathering functions. Many of the original MI departments, such as MI4 (Aerial Photography) were renamed or eventually subsumed into Defence Intelligence.

=== Joint Intelligence Bureau ===
Shortly after the 1945 end of the Second World War, the topographical department of the War Office was transformed into the Joint Intelligence Bureau (JIB), and its director, Sir Kenneth Strong, became a full member of the Joint Intelligence Committee (JIC) in January 1947. The JIB was structured into a series of divisions: procurement (JIB 1), geographic (JIB 2 and JIB 3), defences, ports and beaches (JIB 4), airfields (JIB 5), key points (JIB 6), oil (JIB 7) and telecommunications (JIB 8).

=== Defence Intelligence Staff ===
When the Ministry of Defence (MOD) was formed in 1964, Naval Intelligence, Military Intelligence and Air Intelligence combined to form the Defence Intelligence Staff (DIS). Although the DIS focussed initially on Cold War issues, more recently its attention has moved to support for overseas operations, to weapons of mass destruction and to international counter-terrorism activities.

In an effort to demonstrate justification for British participation in the 2003 invasion of Iraq, Operation TELIC, use was made of intelligence material and product to compile a dossier released into the public domain by the British Prime Minister, Tony Blair. The dossier was compiled by the JIC and published in September 2002 to support the case for invasion. Shortly after the dossier was published, Parliament ratified the government's decision to go to war.

A number of weapon specialist staff in the DIAS expressed concern about the wording related to the existence of weapons of mass destruction in Iraq and the corresponding threat to the UK. Dr Brian Jones, head of the counter-proliferation analysis branch with others complained in writing to the then DCDI (Tony Cragg) that the wording of the dossier was too strong. A particular source of criticism was a claim that Iraq "could" launch chemical or biological weapons within 45 minutes of an order to do so, should have been hedged with caveats. These concerns were overruled by the then CDI, Air Marshal Sir Joe French.

Another eminent weapons expert who worked closely with the DIS, Dr David Kelly, following off-the-record briefings to journalists about his criticisms of the "45 minute" claim, describing it as risible, were broadcast on the BBCs Today by Andrew Gilligan. The resulting controversy and release of Kelly's name as the source of the report led to his suicide.

The subsequent inquiry, chaired by Lord Hutton, the Hutton Inquiry, into the circumstances surrounding the death of Dr Kelly resulted in the discussion of these issues in public. It was revealed that the 45 minutes claim was based on "compartmentalized" intelligence which had not been exposed to Dr Jones branch. Jones has subsequently said that it was unlikely that should anyone with WMD expertise had seen the "compartmentalized" report prior to its inclusion in the dossier they would have supported its credibility.

Chemical and biological munitions were never deployed during the war, and no evidence of WMD was found. It was succeeded by the Butler Review.

Since the beginning of the Russian invasion of Ukraine, Defence Intelligence has regularly released intelligence information, including information on the course of the war. The Russian government accuses the UK Government of a targeted disinformation campaign. Intelligence information released has included details of anticipated Russian troop movements. Since June 2021, Defence Intelligence has also been reporting on the latest Ukraine offensive.

In 2012 the Joint Forces Intelligence Group (JFIG) was established under the new Joint Forces Command and superseded the Intelligence Collection Group (ICG). Making up the largest sub-element of Defence Intelligence, JFIG was made responsible for the collection of signals, geospatial, imagery and measurement and signature intelligence and comprised:

- The National Centre for Geospatial Intelligence (NCGI), formerly known as the Defence Geospatial Intelligence Fusion Centre (DGIFC) and prior to that JARIC (Joint Air Reconnaissance Intelligence Centre)
- The Defence Geographic Centre (DGC)
- Joint Services Signals Organisation (JSSO)
- Defence HUMINT Unit (DHU)

The National Centre for Geospatial Intelligence (NCGI) was based at RAF Wyton in Cambridgeshire (since moving from RAF Brampton in 2013) and provides specialist imagery intelligence to the armed forces and other UK government customers. They deliver this through the exploitation of satellite imaging systems, as well as airborne and ground-based collection systems. NCGI uses these sources, together with advanced technologies, to provide regional intelligence assessments and support to strategic intelligence projections. In 2014, the NGCI became the Defence Intelligence Fusion Centre.

The Defence HUMINT Organisation (DHO) is a Tri-Service organisation that provides specialist support to military operations. The DHO manages strategic aspects of defence human intelligence and is under the command of a Colonel. It draws staff from across the three services.

The Joint Services Signals Organisation (JSSO) collects signals intelligence. The JSSO is based at RAF Digby in Lincolnshire under the command of a Group Captain with some 1,600 staff drawn from all three services. One of its components is JSSO (Cyprus) which runs electronic intelligence gathering activities at Ayios Nikolaos Station in Cyprus.

In 2013, JFIG HQ moved from Feltham in Middlesex to RAF Wyton.

In 2024 the JFIG as a body was reportedly disbanded. How its subordinate organisations were reallocated is not clear.

=== Military Intelligence Services ===
The Military Intelligence Services (MIS) is an organisation within the Ministry of Defence of the government of the United Kingdom. Its role is to consolidate military intelligence capabilities across the different branches of the British Armed Forces under a single operational structure. It was created in December 2025. MIS bring together intelligence units from the Royal Navy, British Army, Royal Air Force, UK Space Command, and Permanent Joint Headquarters, ensuring they operate as one system.

== Organisation ==
Defence Intelligence is headed by the Chief of Defence Intelligence (CDI) who is either a serving three-star military officer or a Senior Civil Servant and who, as the MOD's 'intelligence process owner', is also responsible for the overall co-ordination of intelligence activities throughout the Armed Forces and single Service Commands. He is supported by two deputies—one civilian and one military. The civilian Deputy Chief of Defence Intelligence (DCDI) is responsible for Defence Intelligence analysis and production and the military Director of Cyber Intelligence and Information Integration (DCI3) is responsible for intelligence collection and capability.

=== Deputy Chief of Defence Intelligence (DCDI) ===
DCDI manages the intelligence analysis and production directorates of Defence Intelligence. These include directorates for:

- Strategic Assessments (regional and thematic)
- Capability Assessments (weapons systems and platforms)
- Counter Proliferation
- Counter Intelligence

DCDI is responsible for intelligence analysis and production, providing global defence intelligence assessments and strategic warning on a wide range of issues including, intelligence support for operations; proliferation and arms control; conventional military capabilities; strategic warning and technical evaluations of weapons systems. These intelligence assessments draw upon classified information provided by GCHQ, SIS, the Security Service, Allied intelligence services and military collection assets, in addition to diplomatic reporting and a wide range of publicly available or ‘open source’ information such as media reporting and the internet.

=== Director of Cyber Intelligence and Information Integration (DCI3) ===
DCI3 is responsible for the provision of specialised intelligence, imagery and geographic support services, and for the intelligence and security training of the Armed Forces. In addition to a Head Office policy staff he is responsible for several major groupings within Defence Intelligence.

=== Joint Intelligence Training Group (JITG) ===
The Joint Intelligence Training Group (JITG), at MOD Chicksands, Bedfordshire, is the focal point for defence intelligence, security, languages and photography training in the UK, though photography training is carried out at the Defence School of Photography (DSoP) at RAF Cosford. The organisation consists of a headquarters, the Defence College of Intelligence and a specialist operational intelligence capability. JITG is co-located with the headquarters of the British Army's Intelligence Corps.

== Defence intelligence roles ==
To support its mission, Defence Intelligence has four essential roles:

Support to operations: DI plays an integral part in the planning process throughout all stages of military operations, by providing intelligence collection and analysis at the tactical, operational and strategic levels. Examples of the support DI has provided to operations are:

- Coalition action in Iraq
- NATO led forces in Afghanistan and Bosnia
- UN humanitarian and peace-support operations in Sierra Leone, Liberia, Cyprus, Eritrea and the Democratic Republic of Congo

DI has deployed intelligence analysts, linguists and reservists overseas, and provide geographic support by supplying both standard and specialised mapping to overseas theatres.

Support to contingency planning for operations: DI provides intelligence data and all source assessments that assist in preparations for future situations with the potential to require the commitment of UK Armed Forces. These products, which cover political and military developments, country and cultural information, critical infrastructure and internal security, all aid contingency planning.

Provision of early warning: A fundamental responsibility of Defence Intelligence is to alert ministers, chiefs of staff, senior officials and defence planners to impending crises around the world. Such warning is vital for short and medium term planning. DI meets this responsibility by focusing on current areas and topics of concern, highlighting the effects of changing circumstances, predicting security and stability trends, and assessing how these trends may develop. The assessments are distributed to decision-makers throughout the MOD, the Armed Forces, other government departments, allies, and UK Embassies and High Commissions.

Provision of longer-term analysis of emerging threats: Defence Intelligence provides longer-term assessments of likely scenarios around the world where UK Armed Forces might need to operate and of the equipment that they might face. It also provides technical support to the development of future military equipment and to the development of countermeasures against potentially hostile systems.

== Chiefs of Defence Intelligence ==
Car flag of the Chief of Defence Intelligence

The Chiefs have been as follows:
Director-General Intelligence

- Major-General Sir Kenneth Strong, 1964–1966
- Air Chief Marshal Sir Alfred Earle, rtd 1966–1968
- Air Marshal Sir Harold Maguire, rtd 1968–1972
- Vice-Admiral Sir Louis Le Bailly rtd 1972–1975
- Lieutenant-General Sir David Willison, rtd 1975–1978
- Air Chief Marshal Sir John Aiken, rtd 1978–1981
- Vice-Admiral Sir Roy Halliday, rtd 1981–1984

Chiefs of Defence Intelligence

- Air Marshal Sir Michael Armitage 1984–1986
- Lieutenant-General Sir Derek Boorman 1986–1988
- Vice-Admiral Sir John Kerr 1988–1991
- Air Marshal Sir John Walker, 1991–1994
- Lieutenant-General Sir John Foley, 1994–1997
- Vice-Admiral Sir Alan West, 1997–2000
- Air Marshal Sir Joe French, 2000–2003
- Lieutenant-General Sir Andrew Ridgway, 2003–2006
- Air Marshal Sir Stuart Peach 2006–2009
- Air Marshal Christopher Nickols 2009–2012
- Vice-Admiral Alan Richards 2012–2015
- Air Marshal Philip Osborn 2015–2018
- General Sir James Hockenhull 2018–2022
- Adrian Bird 2022–2026
- Lieutenant General Matthew Jones 2026–present

== See also ==
- Australian Geospatial Organisation (AGO) – Australian counterpart
- British intelligence agencies
- Canadian Forces Intelligence Command (CFINTCOM) – Canadian counterpart
- Defense Intelligence Agency (DIA) – United States counterpart
- Defence Intelligence Organisation (DIO) – Australian counterpart
- Directorate of Defence Intelligence and Security (DDIS) – New Zealand counterpart
- List of intelligence agencies
- Ministry of Defence
- National Geospatial Intelligence Agency (NGA) – United States counterpart
- Operation Rockingham
- RAF Intelligence

== Sources ==
- Dylan, Huw (2014). Defence Intelligence and the Cold War: Britain's Joint Intelligence Bureau 1945–1964. Oxford University Press. ISBN 978-0199657025.
