= Intelligence, Surveillance and Reconnaissance Group =

British Army formation

- Tactical Recognition Flash
- Active: 2014–2024 (as 1st ISR Brigade) 2024–Present
- Country: United Kingdom
- Branch: British Army
- Type: Intelligence, Surveillance and Reconnaissance
- Size: Group
- Part of: Field Army Troops
- Headquarters: Trenchard Lines, Upavon
- Nickname: ISR Gp
- Website: https://www.army.mod.uk/learn-and-explore/about-the-army/formations-divisions-brigades/field-army-troops/intelligence-surveillance-and-reconnaissance-group/

The Intelligence, Surveillance and Reconnaissance Group is a formation of the British Army that commands the Army's miniature UAS, tactical UAS, counter-intelligence and reach back intelligence capabilities, the Specialist Group Military Intelligence and the Land Intelligence Fusion Centre.

== History ==
=== 1st Intelligence, Surveillance and Reconnaissance Brigade ===
Under the Army 2020 programme, a larger emphasis was placed on cyber and specialist capabilities. As part of this reorganisation, the 1st Military Intelligence Brigade, the Royal Artillery's UAS regiments, Honourable Artillery Company and the two reserve Special Air Service (SAS) Regiments came under the command of the newly formed 1st Intelligence Surveillance and Reconnaissance Brigade. The new brigade was stood up on 1 September 2014 at Upavon and placed under Force Troops Command.

=== Intelligence, Surveillance and Reconnaissance Group ===
Under the Future Soldier programme announced on 25 November 2021, the brigade was reduced to a Colonel's Command, became the Intelligence, Surveillance, and Reconnaissance Group and transferred from the now disbanded 6th Division to Field Army Troops. The role of the group is to be to command the Army's miniature UAS, tactical UAS, counter-intelligence, and reach back intelligence capabilities, the Specialist Group Military Intelligence, and Land Intelligence Fusion Centre. It also commands the Land Image Intelligence Company, a pool of experts who deliver image analysis for all the Army's image collection platforms.

== Structure ==
=== Before becoming ISR Group ===
Headquarters, 1st Intelligence, Surveillance, and Reconnaissance Brigade, at Trenchard Lines, Upavon

- 14 Signal Regiment (Electronic Warfare), Royal Corps of Signals, at Cawdor Barracks, Brawdy
- 2nd Military Intelligence (Exploitation) Battalion, Intelligence Corps, at Trenchard Lines, Upavon
- 3rd Military Intelligence Battalion, Intelligence Corps, in Hackney
- 4th Military Intelligence Battalion, Intelligence Corps, at Ward Barracks, Bulford Camp
- 6th Military Intelligence Battalion, Intelligence Corps, in Manchester – paired with 2 Military Intelligence Battalion
- 7th Military Intelligence Battalion, Intelligence Corps, in Bristol – paired with 4 Military Intelligence Battalion
- 32 Regiment Royal Artillery, at Roberts Barracks, Larkhill Garrison (UAV operations, with Lockheed Martin Desert Hawk III)
- Specialist Group Military Intelligence, at Denison Barracks, Hermitage
- Defence Intelligence Fusion Centre, at Denison Barracks, Hermitage
- Defence Cultural and Linguistic Support Unit, at Denison Barracks, Hermitage

=== On formation in 2014 ===
Headquarters 1st Intelligence and Surveillance Brigade, at Trenchard Lines, Upavon

- 14 Signal Regiment (Electronic Warfare), Royal Corps of Signals, at Cawdor Barracks, Brawdy
- 1 Military Intelligence Battalion, Intelligence Corps, at Bourlon Barracks, Catterick Garrison
- 2 Military Intelligence Battalion, Intelligence Corps, at Trenchard Lines, Upavon
- 3 Military Intelligence Battalion, Intelligence Corps), in Hackney, London – paired with 1 MI Bn
- 4 Military Intelligence Battalion, Intelligence Corps, at Ward Barracks, Bulford Camp
- 5 Military Intelligence Battalion, Intelligence Corps, in Edinburgh – paired with 1 MI Bn
- 6 Military Intelligence Battalion, Intelligence Corps, in Manchester – paired with 2 MI Bn
- 7 Military Intelligence Battalion, Intelligence Corps, in Bristol – paired with 4 MI Bn
- 5th Regiment, Royal Artillery, at Marne Barracks, Catterick Garrison
- 32 Regiment, Royal Artillery, at Roberts Barracks, Larkhill Garrison (Mini UAS)
- 47 Regiment, Royal Artillery, at Horne Barracks, Larkhill Garrison (Tactical UAVs)
- 104 Regiment, Royal Artillery, in Newport (Mini UAS) – paired with 32 & 47 Regiments RA
- The Honourable Artillery Company, at Finsbury Barracks, Finsbury, London
- 21(Artists)(Reserve) SAS Regiment, at Albany Barracks, Regents Park, London
- 23(Reserve) SAS Regiment, at Kingstanding, Birmingham
- Specialist Group Military Intelligence, at Denison Barracks, Hermitage
- Defence Cultural Specialist Unit, at Denison Barracks, Hermitage
- Land Intelligence Fusion Centre, at Denison Barracks, Hermitage

== List of commanders ==
1st Intelligence, Surveillance and Reconnaissance Brigade

- 2014–2016: Tom Copinger-Symes
- 2016–2018: James Bowder
- 2018–2020: Julian Buczacki
- 2020–2021: Matthew Jones

Intelligence, Surveillance and Reconnaissance Group
