= Homeland Security Group =

Executive directorate of the UK Home Office

Homeland Security Group (previously named Office for Security and Counter Terrorism) is an executive directorate of the UK government Home Office, created in 2007, responsible for leading the work on counterterrorism in the UK, working closely with the police and security services. The office reports to the Home Secretary, and to the Minister of State for Security. Its current Director General is Chloe Squires, who is the senior government official responsible for counter-terrorist and organised crime strategy.

== History ==
The Home Office moved to a new structure on 1 April 2021 under which the Office for Security and Counter Terrorism (OSCT) became the Homeland Security Group.

== Responsibilities ==
According to its website, the current responsibilities of the Homeland Security Group (HSG) are:

- exercising the UK's response to a terrorist incident;
- developing legislation on terrorism here and overseas;
- providing security measures and protection packages for public figures;
- ensuring that the UK's critical national infrastructure is protected from attack (including electronic attack);
- ensuring that the UK is prepared to deal with a chemical, biological, or nuclear release; and
- liaising with government and emergency services during terrorist incidents or counter-terrorism operations,

In May 2014, the Director General of HSG made a witness statement on behalf of the government and the three main intelligence agencies for the Investigatory Powers Tribunal, in a legal case brought by advocacy groups including Privacy International, Liberty and Amnesty International, explaining the legal basis for the interception of electronic communications under the Regulation of Investigatory Powers Act 2000. This was characterised in the media as an explanation of how the security services can legally monitor "Facebook, Google and Twitter" usage by UK citizens.

HSG has a total staff of 1,061 as of 31 March 2021.

== Programmes ==
The Preventing Violent Extremism strategy ("Prevent") is a £140 million programme run by HSG.

In 2013, HSG stated that 500 people had gone through its Channel deradicalisation programme, including some considering participating in the Syrian civil war, steering some away from violent extremism.

== See also ==
- Anti-terrorism, Crime and Security Act 2001#Part 11 (Retention of communications data)
- British intelligence agencies
- Communications Data Bill 2008
- Data retention
- Internet censorship in the United Kingdom
- Mastering the Internet
- Patriot Act
- PRISM (surveillance program)
- Regulation of Investigatory Powers Act 2000
- Telecommunications data retention#United Kingdom
