= Joint Intelligence Organisation (United Kingdom) =

United Kingdom intelligence agency

Organisation overview
- Jurisdiction: Government of the United Kingdom
- Headquarters: 70 Whitehall, London, England, United Kingdom
- Annual budget: ▲£ 5.2 million
- Minister responsible: Rt Hon. Louise Haigh MP, First Secretary of State, Chancellor of the Duchy of Lancaster and Minister for the Cabinet Office
- Organisation executive: Adrian Bird, Chair of the Joint Intelligence Committee and Head of the Joint Intelligence Organisation

The Joint Intelligence Organisation is a British intelligence agency responsible for intelligence assessment and development of the UK intelligence community's analytical capability. It is headed by a Permanent Secretary-level civil servant.

The organisation supports the work of the Joint Intelligence Committee (tasked with directing the Secret Intelligence Service (MI6), Security Service (MI5) and GCHQ) and National Security Council by providing intelligence assessments to Ministers and senior officials.

== Intelligence assessment ==
The primary function of the organisation is to provide assessments of situations and issues of current concern, warnings of threats to British interests and identifying and monitoring countries at risk of instability.

Consisting of intelligence analysts from a wide range of departments and disciplines, an assessments staff draws upon a range of intelligence, primarily from British intelligence agencies but also diplomatic reporting and open source material.

The Joint Intelligence Committee agrees most assessments before they are circulated to Ministers and senior officials.

== Professional Head of Intelligence Analysis ==
The Head of the JIO is also the Professional Head of Intelligence Analysis, and advises on gaps and duplication in analyst training and on recruitment of analysts, career structures and interchange opportunities in order to improve the UK intelligence community's analytical capability.

The Professional Head of Intelligence Analysis also carries out the development of analytical methodology and training for all UK intelligence community intelligence analysts.

== See also ==
- British intelligence agencies
- Joint Intelligence Committee
- National Security Council (United Kingdom)
- Intelligence and Security Committee
- Office of National Intelligence (the Australian equivalent of JIO)
