= ACD =

ACD may refer to:

== Brands and enterprises ==
- ACD (telecommunications company), carrier and Internet Service Provider, headquartered in Lansing, Michigan
- ACD Systems, a computer software manufacturer
- Advanced Chemistry Development (ACD/Labs), a chemistry software company

== Organizations ==
- ACD San Marcial, a Spanish football team based in Lardero, La Rioja
- Adelaide College of Divinity, an Australian theological college
- African Congress of Democrats, a South African political party
- Arbeitsgemeinschaft der Christengemeinden in Deutschland (Association of Christian Churches in Germany)
- Asia Cooperation Dialogue, an international organization
- Asiatic Cavalry Division, a White Army unit that fought in the Russian Civil War
- Centre Right Alliance (Romania) (Romanian: Alianța de Centru Dreapta), a political alliance
- Australasian College of Dermatologists, a medical specialist college

== People ==
- Arthur Conan Doyle, creator of Sherlock Holmes

== Science and healthcare ==
- ACD (gene), protein encoded by the ACD gene
- α-Cyclodextrin, a glucose polymer
- Alveolar capillary dysplasia, disorder of the lung
- Anemia of chronic disease, form of anemia
- Aragonite compensation depth, a property of oceans
- Allergic contact dermatitis, form of contact dermatitis

== Technology ==
- Activity-centered design, design based on how humans interact with technology
- Anti-collision device, on Indian railways
- Apple Cinema Display, a line of monitors
- Automatic call distributor, device that directs incoming phone calls
- Average call duration, average length of telephone calls

== Other uses ==
- ACD (album), a 1989 album by Half Man Half Biscuit
- Adjournment in contemplation of dismissal, court ruling to defer the disposition of a defendant's case
- Antecedent-contained deletion in grammar
- Activity cycle diagram, a systems modelling paradigm
- Alcides Fernández Airport in Acandí, Chocó Department, Colombia (IATA code ACD)
- Autoregressive conditional duration, a class of models used in financial econometrics
- Kyode language (ISO 639-3 code), a Guang language of Ghana
- Australian Cattle Dog, a breed of herding dog
