= Data retention =

Storage of telephony and internet traffic and transaction metadata

Data retention defines the policies of persistent data and records management for meeting legal and business data archival requirements. Although sometimes interchangeable, it is not to be confused with the Data Protection Act 1998.

The different data retention policies balance legal, privacy, economic and access-related considerations to determine the retention time, archival rules, data formats, and the permissible means of storage, access, and encryption.

== Implementation ==
In the field of telecommunications, "data retention" generally refers to the storage of call detail records (CDRs) of telephony and internet traffic and transaction data (IPDRs) by governments and commercial organisations. In the case of government data retention, the data that is stored is usually of telephone calls made and received, emails sent and received, and websites visited. Location data is also collected.

The primary objective in government data retention is traffic analysis and mass surveillance. By analysing the retained data, governments can identify the locations of individuals, an individual's associates and the members of a group such as political opponents. These activities may or may not be lawful, depending on the constitutions and laws of each country. In many jurisdictions, access to these databases may be made by a government with little or no judicial oversight.

In the case of commercial data retention, the data retained will usually be on transactions and websites visited.

Data retention also covers data collected by other means (e.g., by Automatic number-plate recognition systems) and held by government and commercial organisations.

== Policies ==
A data retention policy establishes an organisation's rules for retaining information for operational, legal and regulatory purposes. The objectives of a data retention policy are to keep important information for future use or reference, to organize information so it can be searched and accessed at a later date and to dispose of information that is no longer needed.

An organisation's data retention policies specify which data will be archived, how long they will be retained, and whether they will be archived or destroyed at the end of the retention period.

A part of any effective data retention policy is the permanent deletion of the retained data; achieving secure deletion of data by encrypting the data when stored, and then deleting the encryption key after a specified retention period. Thus, effectively deleting the data object and its copies stored in online and offline locations.

== By region ==
=== Australia ===
In 2015, the Australian government introduced mandatory data retention laws that require data to be retained up to two years. The scheme is estimated to cost at least AU$400 million per year to implement, working out to at least $16 per user per year. It requires telecommunication providers and Internet service providers (ISPs) to retain telephony, Internet and email metadata for two years, accessible without a warrant, and could possibly be used to target file sharing. The Attorney-General has broad discretion on which agencies are allowed to access metadata, including private agencies.

The Greens were strongly opposed to the introduction of these laws, citing privacy concerns and the increased prospect of 'speculative invoicing' over alleged copyright infringement cases. The Labor Party initially opposed as well, but later agreed to passing the law after additional safeguards were put in place to afford journalists some protection.

=== European Union ===
On 15 March 2006, the European Union adopted the Data Retention Directive. It required Member States to ensure that communications providers retain data as specified in the Directive for a period of between 6 months and 2 years in order to:

- Trace and identify the source of a communication;
- Trace and identify the destination of a communication;
- Identify the date, time, and duration of a communication;
- Identify the type of communication;
- Identify the communication device;
- Identify the location of mobile communication equipment.

The data was required to be available to "competent" national authorities "for the purpose of the investigation, detection and prosecution of serious crime, as defined by each Member State in its national law".

The Directive covered fixed telephony, mobile telephony, Internet access, email, and VoIP. Member States were required to transpose it into national law within 18 months—no later than September 2007. However, they could if they wished postpone the application of the Directive to Internet access, email, and VoIP for a further 18 months after this date. A majority of Member States exercised this option. All 28 EU States at the time notified the European Commission about the transposition of the Directive into their national law. Of these, however, Germany and Belgium had only transposed the legislation partially.

A report evaluating the Directive was published by the European Commission in April 2011. It concluded that data retention was a valuable tool for ensuring criminal justice and public protection, but that it had achieved only limited harmonisation. There were serious concerns from service providers about the compliance costs and from civil society organisations who claimed that mandatory data retention was an unacceptable infringement of the fundamental right to privacy and the protection of personal data according to EU law.

In response to the report, on May 31, 2011, the European Data Protection Supervisor expressed some concerns on the European Data Retention Directive, underlining that the Directive "does not meet the requirements imposed by the fundamental rights to privacy and data protection".

==== Social networks ====
In November 2012, answers to a parliamentary inquiry in the German Bundestag revealed plans of some EU countries including France to extend data retention to chats and social media. Furthermore, the German Federal Office for the Protection of the Constitution (Germany's domestic intelligence agency) has confirmed that it has been working with the ETSI LI Technical Committee since 2003.

==== Criticism and abolishment ====
Criticisms of the directive arose. The council's Legal Services was reported to have stated in closed session that paragraph 59 of the European Court of Justice's ruling "suggests that general and blanket data retention is no longer possible". A legal opinion funded by the Greens/EFA Group in the European Parliament finds that the blanket retention data of unsuspected persons generally violates the EU Charter of Fundamental Rights, both in regard to national telecommunications data retention laws and to similar EU data retention schemes (PNR, TFTP, TFTS, LEA access to EES, Eurodac, VIS).

Digital Rights Ireland brought the directive to the High Court of Ireland, which then brought it further to the European Court of Justice of the European Union. The case was also joined by the Constitutional Court of Austria. The Court on 8 April 2014 declared the Directive 2006–24/EC invalid for violating fundamental rights, stating that "the directive interferes in a particularly serious manner with the fundamental rights to respect for private life and to the protection of personal data".

This led further to that the member states in various degrees abolished or modified their implementations of the directive. Since the Swedish implementation of the directive was kept in a similar manner, the Swedish implementation was brought to the European Court by the telecom provider Tele2, and the case was merged with a similar case from the United Kingdom, initiated by three persons with intervention by Open Rights Group, Privacy International and The Law Society of England and Wales. Since the original directive no longer existed, the basis for the judgment was an exception to the Directive on privacy and electronic communications in its Article 15(1), referring to the possibility to exceptionally apply data retention for fighting serious crime. On 21 of December 2016 the Court ruled that "the protection of privacy in the electronic communications sector must be interpreted as precluding national legislation which, for the purpose of fighting crime, provides for general and indiscriminate retention of all traffic and location data of all subscribers and registered users relating to all means of electronic communication." Blanket data retention was ruled out another time, but the actual consequences all over the EU are varied and under discussion since then.

==== Czech Republic ====
Implementation of the directive was part of Act. No. 259/2010 Coll. on electronic communications as later amended. Under Art. 97 (3), telecommunication data are to be stored between 6 and 12 months. The Czech Constitutional Court has deemed the law unconstitutional and found it to be infringing on the people's right to privacy.

As of July 2012, new legislation was on its way.

==== Denmark ====
Denmark has implemented the EU data retention directive and much more, by logging all internet flow or sessions between operators and operators and consumers.

- "2.2.1. Session logging (section 5(1) of the Executive Order) Providers of access to the internet must, in respect of the initiating and terminating package of an internet session, retain data that identifies the sending and receiving internet protocol address (in the following called IP address), the sending and receiving port number and the transmission protocol."
- "2.2.2. Sampling (section 5(4) of the Executive Order) The obligation to retain data about the initiating and terminating package of an internet session does not apply to providers in case such retention is not technically feasible in their systems. In that case, data must instead be retained for every 500th package that is part of an end user's communication on the internet."
- "2.2.5. Hot spots (section 5(3) of the Executive Order) In addition to the internet data that must otherwise be retained, the provider must retain data that identifies the precise geographic or physical location of a hot spot and the identity of the communication equipment used. This means that a provider of internet access via a hot spot must retain data on a user's access to the internet and, at the same time, retain data that identifies the geographic location of the hot spot in question."

==== Germany ====
The German Bundestag had implemented the directive in "Gesetz zur Neuregelung der Telekommunikationsüberwachung und anderer verdeckter Ermittlungsmaßnahmen sowie zur Umsetzung der Richtlinie 2006/24/EG". The law became valid on 1 January 2008. Any communications data had to be retained for six months. On 2 March 2010, the Federal Constitutional Court of Germany ruled the law unconstitutional as a violation of the guarantee of the secrecy of correspondence. On 16 October 2015, a second law for shorter, up to 10 weeks long, data retention excluding email communication was passed by parliament. However, this act was ruled incompatible with German and European laws by an injunction of the Higher Administrative Court of North Rhine-Westphalia. As a result, on June 28, 2017, three days before the planned start of data retention, the Federal Network Agency suspended the introduction of data retention until a final decision in the principle proceedings.

==== Italy ====
In July 2005 new legal requirements on data retention came into force in Italy.

Subscriber information
Internet cafés and public telephone shops with at least three terminals must seek a license permit within 30 days from the Ministry of Home Affairs. They must also store traffic data for a period which may be determined later by administrative decree. Wi-Fi hotspots and locations that do not store traffic data have to secure ID information from users before allowing them to log on. For example, users may be required to enter a number from an ID card or driving license. It is not clear how this information is validated. Mobile telephony users must identify themselves before service activation, or before a SIM card may be obtained. Resellers of mobile subscriptions or pre-paid cards must verify the identity of purchasers and retain a photocopy of identity cards.
Telephony data
Data, including location data, on fixed line and mobile telephony must be retained for 24 months. There is no requirement to store the content of calls. Telephony operators must retain a record of all unsuccessful dial attempts.
ISP data
ISPs must retain all data for at least 12 months. The law does not specify exactly what traffic data must be retained. There is no requirement to store the content of internet communications.
Legality
The legislation of July 2005 enables data retention by outlawing all the relevant data protection provisions until 31 December 2007. Under the data protection provisions, service providers are obliged to store traffic data and user data for no less than 365 days, even if they no longer need it to process the communication or to send bills, policy requires user id information, location, tracking data be stored and kept on file for easy access by law enforcement and/or other authorities who request this information (permission must be asked to view sensitive user ID data on file). The traffic data which will now be retained can be used for anti-terrorism purposes and for general penal enforcement of criminal offences large and small.

Italy already required the retention of telephony traffic data for 48 months, but without location data. Italy has adopted the EU Directive on Privacy and Electronic Communications 2002 but with an exemption to the requirement to erase traffic data.

==== Portugal ====
The directive was transposed into law by Law 32/2008. In December 2017, D3 – Defesa dos Direitos Digitais, a Portuguese digital rights organization, presented a complaint to the Justice Ombudsman, based on the case law of the Court of Justice of the European Union, following several opinions of the Portuguese Data Protection Authority. In January 2019, the Ombudsman issued an official recommendation to the Justice Ministry, defending the need to change the national law, in order to comply with the CJEU case law. Some weeks later, in March, the Ombudsman received an answer by the Minister of Justice, where the Minister refused changes to the law. As such, in August 2019, the Ombudsman decided to ask the Portuguese Constitutional Court for a ruling on the constitutionality of the law. In 2022, the Portuguese Constitutional Court published its decision, striking down Law 32/2008 as unconstitutional. Among other things, the Court considered that an undifferentiated and generalized obligation to store all traffic and location data relating to all people did not respect the proportionality principle. In response to this decision, the parliament created a data retention working party, which studied the subject for more than a year and held several hearings with experts. In 2023, a law proposal was approved in the parliament. However, the President of the Republic decided to make use of its prerogative of asking the Constitutional Court for a preventive rule, before approving the law. In this ruling, the Constitutional Court once again decided against the proposed data retention regime, for similar reasons, as the law still required indiscriminate and general data retention of traffic and location data. The diploma was returned to the Parliament and did not become law. In 2024, the Parliament approved a new law proposal. This time, the President of the Republic opted for not requesting a preventive rule from the Constitutional Court, and so the law was published and entered into force. The digital rights association D3 – Defesa dos Direitos Digitais maintains that the current law is still a violation of fundamental rights, as it delegates core elements of a fundamental rights restriction to a special formation of the Supreme Court. This makes it impossible to demonstrate the required proportionality of the restriction, or to demonstrate how the data retention regime preserves the essential core of the restricted fundamental rights, as it must.

==== Romania ====
The EU directive has been transposed into Romanian law as well, initially as Law 298/2008. However, the Constitutional Court of Romania subsequently struck down the law in 2009 as violating constitutional rights. The court held that the transposing act violated the constitutional rights of privacy, of confidentiality in communications, and of free speech. The European Commission has subsequently sued Romania in 2011 for non-implementation, threatening Romania with a fine of 30,000 euros per day. The Romanian parliament passed a new law in 2012, which was signed by president Traian Băsescu in June. The Law 82/2012 has been nicknamed "Big Brother" (using the untranslated English expression) by various Romanian non-governmental organizations opposing it. On July 8, 2014, this law too was declared unconstitutional by the Constitutional Court of Romania.

==== Slovakia ====
Slovakia has implemented the directive in Act No. 610/2003 Coll. on electronic communications as later amended. Telecommunication data are stored for six months in the case of data related to Internet, Internet email and Internet telephony (art. 59a (6) a), and for 12 months in the case of other types of communication (art. 59a (6) b).

In April 2014, the Slovak Constitutional Court preliminary suspended effectiveness of the Slovak implementation of Data Retention Directive and accepted the case for the further review. In April 2015, the Constitutional Court decided that some parts of Slovak laws implementing DR Directive are not in compliance with Slovak constitution and Convention for the Protection of Human Rights and Fundamental Freedoms. According to now invalid provisions of the Electronic Communications Act, the providers of electronic communications were obliged to store traffic data, localization data and data about the communicating parties for a period of 6 months (in the case Internet, email or VoIP communication) or for a period of 12 months (in case of other communication).

==== Sweden ====
Sweden implemented the EU's 2006 Data Retention Directive in May 2012, and it was fined €3 million by the Court of Justice of the European Union for its belated transposition (the deadline was 15 September 2007). The directive allowed member states to determine the duration data is retained, ranging from six months to two years; the Riksdag, Sweden's legislature, opted for six months.

In April 2014, however, the CJEU struck down the Data Retention Directive. Following the judgement, PTS, Sweden's telecommunications regulator, told Swedish ISPs and telcos that they would no longer have to retain call records and internet metadata. The Swedish government initiated a one-man investigation that stated that Sweden could keep on with data-retention. After that, the PTS reversed course. Most of Sweden's major telecommunications companies complied immediately, though Tele2 appealed this order before the Administrative Court in Stockholm claiming that the Swedish implementation should be reversed following the directive being declared invalid, including the fact that the Swedish implementation went further than the directive, including registration of failed telephone calls and the geographic endpoint of a mobile communications. The appeal was rejected. The one holdout ISP, Bahnhof, was given an order to comply by November 24 deadline or face a five million krona ($680,000) fine.

Tele2 appealed the first level court rejection to the Swedish Administrative Court of Appeal, that sent the matter to the European Court of Justice of the European Union. That led to a judgement that once again invalidated blanket data retention of all communications of all citizens' communications to combat crime. See under European Union above.

=== United Kingdom ===
==== Data Retention and Investigatory Powers Act 2014 ====
The Data Retention and Investigatory Powers Act came into force in 2014. It is the answer by the United Kingdom parliament after a declaration of invalidity was made by the Court of Justice of the European Union in relation to Directive 2006/ 24/EC in order to make provision, about the retention of certain communications data. In addition, the purpose of the act is to:

- Amend the grounds for issuing interception warrants, or granting or giving certain authorizations or notices.
- Make provision about the extraterritorial application of that Part and about the meaning of "telecommunications service" for the purposes of that Act;
- Make provision about a review of the operation and regulation of investigatory powers; and for connected purposes.

The act is also to ensure that communication companies in the UK retain communications data so that it continues to be available when it is needed by law enforcement agencies and others to investigate committed crimes and protect the public. Data protection law requires data that isn't of use to be deleted. This means that the intention of this Act could be using data retention to acquire further policing powers using, as the Act makes data retention mandatory.

An element of this Act is the provision of the investigatory powers to be reported by 1 May 2015.

==== Controversy ====
The Data Retention and Investigatory Powers Act 2014 was referred to as the "snooper's charter" communications data bill. Theresa May, a strong supporter of the Parliament Act, said in a speech that "If we (parliament) do not act, we risk sleepwalking into a society in which crime can no longer be investigated and terrorists can plot their murderous schemes undisrupted."

The United Kingdom parliament its new laws increasing the power of data retention is essential to tackling crime and protecting the public. However, not all agree and believe that the primary objective in the data retention by the government is mass surveillance.

After Europe's highest court said the depth of data retention breaches citizens' fundamental right to privacy and the UK created its own Act, it has led to the British government being accused of breaking the law by forcing telecoms and internet providers to retain records of phone calls, texts and internet usage. From this information, governments can identify an individual's associates, location, group memberships, political affiliations and other personal information.

In a television interview, the EU Advocate General Pedro Cruz Villalón highlighted the risk that the retained data might be used illegally in ways that are "potentially detrimental to privacy or, more broadly, fraudulent or even malicious".

==== Retention of other data ====
Postal data – retention period unknown
Information written on the outside of a postal item (such as a letter or parcel), online tracking of postal items, records of special postal items (such as records of registered, recorded or special delivery postal items), records of parcel consignment, delivery and collection.
Banking data – seven years
The Economist reported that UK banks are required to retain data on all financial transactions for seven years though this has not been verified. It is not clear whether data on credit card transactions is also retained for seven years.
Vehicle movement data – two years
Documents leaked from the Association of Chief Police Officers (ACPO) have revealed that the UK is planning to collect data from a nationwide network of automatic numberplate recognition cameras and store the data for two years in a controversial new centre being built at Hendon. This data could then be linked to other data held by the government and watchlists from the police and security services.

==== Access to retained data ====
The bodies that are able to access retained data in the United Kingdom are listed in the Regulation of Investigatory Powers Act 2000 (RIPA). These are the following:

- Police forces, as defined in section 81(1) of RIPA
- National Criminal Intelligence Service
- Serious Organised Crime Agency, formerly the National Crime Squad
- HM Customs and Excise
- Inland Revenue (the latter two have been merged into HM Revenue and Customs)
- Security Service
- Secret Intelligence Service
- Government Communications Headquarters (GCHQ)

However, the Regulation of Investigatory Powers Act 2000 (RIPA) also gives the Home Secretary powers to change the list of bodies with access to retained data through secondary legislation. The list of authorised bodies now includes:

- Food Standards Agency
- Local authorities
- National Health Service

==== Reasons for accessing retained data ====
The justifications for accessing retained data in the UK are set out in the Regulation of Investigatory Powers Act 2000 (RIPA). They include:

- Interests of national security;
- Preventing or detecting crime or of preventing disorder;
- Economic well-being of the United Kingdom;
- Public safety;
- Protecting public health;
- Assessing or collecting any tax, duty, levy or other imposition, contribution or charge payable to a government department;
- Preventing death or injury in an emergency or any damage to a person's physical or mental health, or of mitigating any injury or damage to a person's physical or mental health;
- Any other purpose not listed above which is specified for the purposes of this subsection by an order made by the Secretary of State.

=== Norway ===
The EU's Data Retention Directive has been implemented into Norwegian law in 2011, but this will not be in effect before 1 January 2015.

=== Russia ===
A 2016 anti-terrorist federal law 374-FZ known as Yarovaya Law requires all telecommunication providers to store phone call, text and email metadata, as well as the actual voice recordings for up to 6 months. Messaging services like WhatsApp are required to provide cryptographic backdoors to law-enforcement. The law has been widely criticized both in Russia and abroad as an infringement of human rights and a waste of resources.

=== Serbia ===
On 29 June 2010, the Serbian parliament adopted the Law on Electronic Communications, according to which the operator must keep the data on electronic communications for 12 months. This provision was criticized as unconstitutional by opposition parties and by Ombudsman Saša Janković.

=== Switzerland ===
As from 7 July 2016, the Swiss Federal Law about the Surveillance of the Post and Telecommunications entered into force, passed by the Swiss government on 18 March 2016.

==== Mobile phones ====
Swiss mobile phone operators have to retain the following data for six months according to the BÜPF:

1. Phone numbers of incoming and outgoing calls
2. SIM- (Subscriber Identity Module), IMSI- (International Mobile Subscribers Identity) and IMEI-numbers (International Mobile Equipment Identity)
3. "the location and the electrical boresight of the antenna of the mobile phone with which the monitored person is connected to the communications system at the time of the communication"
4. date, time and duration of the connection

==== Email ====
All ISPs must retain the following data for six months:

1. type of the connections (telephone, xDSL, Cable, permanent line etc.) and if known login data, address information of the origin (MAC address, telephone number), name, address and occupation of the user and duration of the connection from beginning to end
2. time of the transmission or reception of an email, header information according to the SMTP-protocol and the IP addresses of the sending and receiving email application.

Email application refers to SMTP-, POP3-, IMAP4, webmail- and remail-server.

==== Exemptions ====
Switzerland only applies data retention to the largest ISPs with over 100 million CHF in annual Swiss-sourced revenue. This notably exempts derived communications providers such as ProtonMail, a popular encrypted email service based in Switzerland.

=== United States ===
The National Security Agency (NSA) commonly records Internet metadata for the whole planet for up to a year in its MARINA database, where it is used for pattern-of-life analysis. U.S. persons are not exempt because metadata are not considered data under US law (section 702 of the FISA Amendments Act). Its equivalent for phone records is MAINWAY. The NSA records SMS and similar text messages worldwide through DISHFIRE.

==== Leveraging commercial data retention ====
Various United States agencies leverage the (voluntary) data retention practised by many U.S. commercial organizations through programs such as PRISM and MUSCULAR.

Amazon is known to retain extensive data on customer transactions. Google is also known to retain data on searches, and other transactions. If a company is based in the United States the Federal Bureau of Investigation (FBI) can obtain access to such information by means of a National Security Letter (NSL). The Electronic Frontier Foundation states that "NSLs are secret subpoenas issued directly by the FBI without any judicial oversight. These secret subpoenas allow the FBI to demand that online service providers or ecommerce companies produce records of their customers' transactions. The FBI can issue NSLs for information about people who haven't committed any crimes.

NSLs are practically immune to judicial review. They are accompanied by gag orders that allow no exception for talking to lawyers and provide no effective opportunity for the recipients to challenge them in court. This secret subpoena authority, which was expanded by the controversial USA PATRIOT Act, could be applied to nearly any online service provider for practically any type of record, without a court ever knowing". The Washington Post has published a well researched article on the FBI's use of National Security Letters.

==== Failed mandatory ISP retention legislation attempts ====
The United States does not have any ISP mandatory data retention laws similar to the European Data Retention Directive, which was retroactively invalidated in 2014 by the Court of Justice of the European Union. Some attempts to create mandatory retention legislation have failed:

- In 1999 two models of mandatory data retention were suggested for the United States: What IP address was assigned to a customer at a specific time. In the second model, "which is closer to what Europe adopted", telephone numbers dialed, contents of Web pages visited, and recipients of e-mail messages must be retained by the ISP for an unspecified amount of time.
- The Internet Stopping Adults Facilitating the Exploitation of Today's Youth Act (SAFETY Act) of 2009 also known as H.R. 1076 and S.436 would require providers of "electronic communication or remote computing services" to "retain for a period of at least two years all records or other information pertaining to the identity of a user of a temporarily assigned network address the service assigns to that user". This bill never became a law.

== Opposition ==
While it is often argued that data retention is necessary to combat terrorism and other crimes, there are still others who oppose data retention. Data retention may assist the police and security services to identify potential terrorists and their accomplices before or after an attack has taken place. For example, the authorities in Spain and the United Kingdom stated that retained telephony data made a significant contribution to police enquires into the 2004 Madrid train bombings and the 2005 London bombings.

The opponents of data retention make the following arguments:

1. The Madrid train bombings can also be seen as proof that the current data retention level is sufficient and hence the EU directive is not necessity.
2. Schemes for data retention do not make provisions for adequate regulation of the data retention process and for independent judicial oversight.
3. Data retention is an invasion of privacy and a disproportionate response to the threat of terrorism.
4. It is easy for terrorists to avoid having their communications recorded. The Home Office Voluntary Code of Practice of Data Retention admits that there are some internet protocols which cannot be effectively monitored. It would be possible for terrorists to avoid monitoring by using anonymous P2P technologies, internet cafés, anonymous proxies or several other methods. Some police officers in the EU are sceptical about the value of data retention. For example, Heinz Kiefer, president of Eurocop, the European Confederation of Police, issued a press statement saying "it remains easy for criminals to avoid detection through fairly simple means, for example mobile phone cards can be purchased from foreign providers and frequently switched. The result would be that a vast effort is made with little more effect on criminals and terrorists than to slightly irritate them. Activities like these are unlikely to boost citizens' confidence in the EU's ability to deliver solutions to their demand for protection against serious crime and terrorism".
5. The hardware and software required to store all the retained data would be extremely costly. The costs of retaining data would not only fall on ISPs and telephone companies, but also on all companies and other organisations which would need to retain records of traffic passing through their switchboards and servers.
6. Data retention gives excessive power to the state to monitor the lives of individual citizens.
7. Data retention may be abused by the police to monitor the activities of any group which may come into conflict with the state; including ones which are engaged in legitimate protests. The UK police have used anti-terrorism powers against groups opposed to the war in Iraq and protesters at an arms fair. The definition of terrorism in the UK Terrorism Act 2000 includes not only action, but the threat of action, involving serious violence against a person, or serious damage to property, for the purposes of advancing a "political, religious or ideological cause". There is concern that the definition is vaguely worded and could be applied to supporters of animal liberation, anti-war demonstrators, and many others.
8. Even if data retention may be justified, the retention periods proposed in some cases are excessive. It has been argued that a period of five days for web activity logs and ninety days for all other data would be adequate for police purposes.
9. Data retention by search engines provides an unfair advantage to dominant search engines.

== Protection against data retention ==
The current directive proposal (see above) would force ISPs to record the internet communications of its users. The basic assumption is that this information can be used to identify with whom someone, whether innocent citizen or terrorist, communicated throughout a specific timespan. Believing that such as mandate would be useful is ignoring that some very committed community of crypto professionals has been preparing for such legislation for decades. Below are some strategies available today to anyone to protect themselves, avoid such traces, and render such expensive and legally dubious logging operations useless.

=== Anonymizing proxy services: Web ===
There are anonymizing proxies that provide slightly more private web access. Proxies must use HTTPS encryption in order to provide any level of protection at all. Unfortunately, proxies require the user to place a large amount of trust in the proxy operator (since they see everything the user does over HTTP), and may be subject to traffic analysis.

=== P2P communications ===
Some P2P services like file transfer or voice over IP use other computers to allow communication between computers behind firewalls. This means that trying to follow a call between two citizens might, mistakenly, identify a third citizen unaware of the communication.

=== Privacy enhancing tools ===
Citizens who prioritize privacy and possess basic technical knowledge may utilize tools like I2P – The Anonymous Network, Tor, Mixmaster, and the cryptography options integrated into any many modern mail clients.

I2P is an international peer-to-peer anonymizing network, which aims at not only evading data retention, but also at making spying by other parties impossible. The structure is similar to the one TOR (see next paragraph) uses, but there are substantial differences. It protects better against traffic analysis and offers strong anonymity and for net-internal traffic end-to-end encryption. Due to unidirectional tunnels it is less prone to timing attacks than Tor. In I2P, several services are available: anonymous browsing, anonymous e-mails, anonymous instant messenger, anonymous file-sharing, and anonymous hosting of websites, among others.

Tor is a project of the U.S. non-profit Tor Project to develop and improve an onion routing network to shield its users from traffic analysis. Mixmaster is a remailer service that allows anonymous email sending.

JAP is a project very similar to Tor. It is designed to route web requests through several proxies to hide the end user's Internet address. Tor support has been included into JAP.

=== Initiative against extensive data retention ===
The Arbeitskreis Vorratsdatenspeicherung (German Working Group on Data Retention) is an association of civil rights campaigners, data protection activists and Internet users. The Arbeitskreis coordinates the campaign against the introduction of data retention in Germany.

An analysis of federal Crime Agency (BKA) statistics published on 27 January 2010 by civil liberties NGO AK Vorrat revealed that data retention did not make a prosecution of serious crime any more effective.

As the EU Commission is currently considering changes to the controversial EU data retention directive, a coalition of more than 100 civil liberties, data protection and human rights associations, jurists, trade unions and others are urging the commission to propose the repeal of the EU requirements regarding data retention in favour of a system of expedited preservation and targeted collection of traffic data.

== See also ==
- Data security
- Data Retention Directive
- Computer data storage
- Data Protection Act 1998
- Customer proprietary network information
- Information privacy
- Electronic discovery
- Lawful interception
- Mass surveillance
- MAINWAY (NSA call database)
- Privacy
- Secrecy of correspondence
- Traffic analysis
- I2P - The Anonymous Network
