= President's Surveillance Program =

Intelligence activities in the US

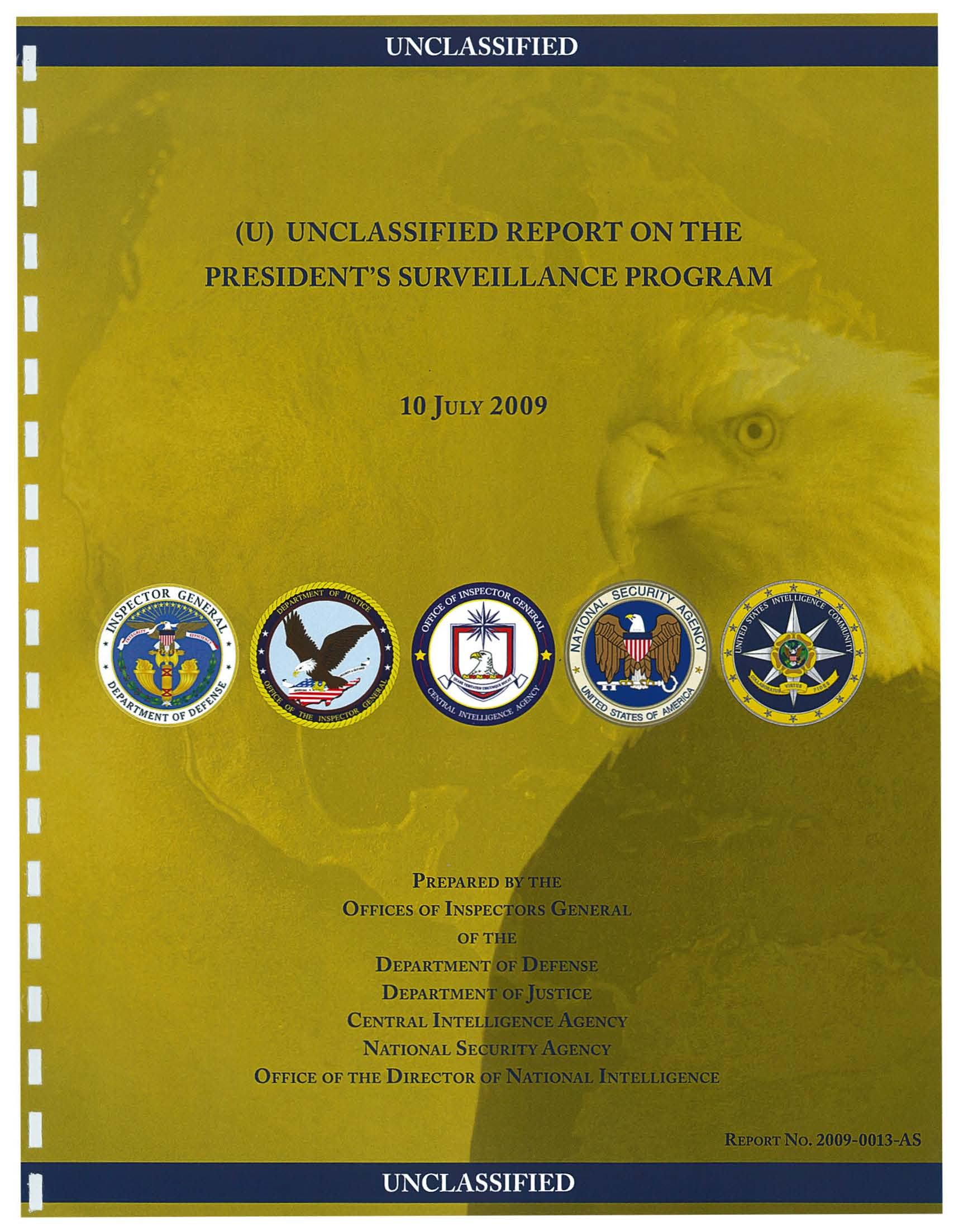
Cover of the July 10, 2009 Unclassified Report on the President’s Surveillance Program

The President's Surveillance Program (PSP) is a collection of secret intelligence activities authorized by the president of the United States George W. Bush after the September 11 attacks in 2001 as part of the war on terrorism. Information collected under this program was protected within a Sensitive Compartmented Information security compartment codenamed STELLARWIND.

The last presidential authorization expired on February 1, 2007, but some of the collection activities were continued, first under the authority of the Protect America Act of 2007, passed in August of that year, and then under the FISA Amendments Act (FAA), which was enacted in July 2008.

One part of the program was the Terrorist Surveillance Program, which authorized warrantless wiretapping of international communications where one party to the communication was believed to be affiliated with al-Qaeda. The other activities have reportedly included data mining of e-mail messages and telephone call detail records in the NSA call database.

In 2007 the attorney general publicly acknowledged the existence of other intelligence activities covered under the same presidential authorizations. The full extent of the President's Surveillance Program was revealed in June 2013, when The Guardian published a highly classified report of the inspector general of the National Security Agency (NSA), describing how the program was established and evolved from September 2001 until January 2007.

The President's Surveillance Program activities were periodically reauthorized by the president, and were later transitioned to authority granted in the Foreign Intelligence Surveillance Act of 1978 Amendments Act of 2008. The act required the Inspectors General of all intelligence agencies involved in the program to "complete a comprehensive review" of the activities through January 17, 2007, and produce an unclassified report within one year after enactment. The report published on July 10, 2009, concluded that the president's program involved "unprecedented collection activities" that went far beyond the scope of the Terrorist Surveillance Program. The report raised questions over the legal underpinnings of the authorizations, a lack of oversight, excessive secrecy, and the effectiveness of the program. The report concluded that the program was built on a "factually flawed" legal analysis.

Public disclosure of the Terrorist Surveillance Program in 2005 ignited the NSA warrantless surveillance controversy. The other classified aspects of the program had also raised serious concerns within the Department of Justice over the program's legal status and its potential effect on future criminal prosecutions. This caused conflicts with the White House that resulted in a dramatic confrontation in 2004 at the hospital bedside of the ailing Attorney General, and nearly led to mass resignations of top Justice officials in protest when they were overruled. The report on the program was also released during a period of intense negotiations over proposed language in the Intelligence Authorization Act for Fiscal Year 2010. This would amend the National Security Act of 1947, increasing the requirements for briefing Congress on some classified intelligence programs like this one—President Barack Obama threatened to veto the bill over that issue.

== Background ==
In the weeks following the terrorist attacks of September 11, 2001, the President of the United States authorized the National Security Agency (NSA) to conduct a classified program to detect and prevent further attacks in the United States. As part of the NSA's classified program, several different intelligence activities were authorized in Presidential authorizations, and the details of these activities changed over time. The program was reauthorized by the President approximately every 45 days, with certain modifications. Collectively, the activities carried out under these authorizations are referred to as the "President's Surveillance Program" (PSP).

One of the activities authorized as part of the PSP was the interception of the content of communications into and out of the United States where there was "a reasonable basis to conclude that one party to the communication is a member of al-Qa'ida, affiliated with al-Qa'ida, or a member of an organization affiliated with al-Qa'ida". After a series of articles published in The New York Times revealed classified details on this aspect of the PSP, they were publicly acknowledged and described by the President, the Attorney General, and other Administration officials beginning in December 2005, including a Presidential radio address on December 17, 2005. The President and other Administration officials labeled the publicly disclosed interception on the content of certain international communications by the NSA as the "Terrorist Surveillance Program" (TSP). The Attorney General subsequently publicly acknowledged that other intelligence activities were also authorized under the same Presidential authorization, but the details of those activities remain classified.

Several different agencies had roles in the PSP. At the request of the White House, the NSA was involved in providing the technical expertise necessary to create the program. The NSA also was responsible for conducting the actual collection of information under the PSP and disseminating intelligence reports to other agencies such as the Federal Bureau of Investigation (FBI), the Central Intelligence Agency (CIA), and the Office of the Director of National Intelligence (ODNI) National Counterterrorism Center (NCTC) for analysis and possible investigation. With the exception of the NSA, the Department of Defense (DoD) had limited involvement in the PSP.

Components of the Department of Justice (DOJ) other than the FBI also were involved in the program. Most significantly, DOJ's Office of Legal Counsel (OLC) provided advice to the White House and the Attorney General on the overall legality of the PSP. In addition, DOJ's Office of Intelligence Policy and Review (now called the Office of Intelligence in DOJ's National Security Division) worked with the FBI and the NSA to address the impact that PSP-derived information had on proceedings under the Foreign Intelligence Surveillance Act (FISA). DOJ's National Security Division also handled potential discovery issues that may have involved PSP-related information in international terrorism prosecutions.

The CIA, in addition to receiving intelligence reports as PSP consumers, requested information from the program and used this information in its intelligence analyses. The CIA also initially prepared threat assessment memoranda that were used to support the periodic Presidential authorizations. Beginning in 2005, the newly created ODNI assumed responsibility for preparing these threat assessment memoranda. In addition, NCTC analysts received program information for possible use in analytical products prepared for the President, senior policymakers, and other Intelligence Community (IC) analysts and officers.

== PSP IG Group report ==
The Inspectors General (IGs) of the Department of Defense (DoD), Department of Justice (DOJ), Central Intelligence Agency (CIA), National Security Agency (NSA), and Office of the Director of National Intelligence (ODNI) – collectively the "PSP IG Group" – conducted the review required under the FISA Amendments Act. The 32 page unclassified report, dated July 10, 2009, summarized the portions of the collective results of the IG reviews that could be released in unclassified form. A separate classified report summarized the classified results of the individual IG reviews. The classified report is reportedly several hundred pages long. The unclassified report revealed new details of internal deliberations over the programs, but few new details on the scope of the surveillance.

The PSP IG Group collectively interviewed approximately 200 government and private sector personnel as part of this review. Among the interviewees were former and current senior government officials, including Director of National Intelligence (DNI) John Negroponte, NSA and CIA Director and Principal Deputy DNI (PDDNI) Michael Hayden, White House Counsel and Attorney General Alberto Gonzales, FBI Director Robert Mueller, and Secretary of Defense Donald Rumsfeld. The IGs did not have the power to compel testimony, and Counsel to the Vice President David Addington, White House Chief of Staff Andrew Card, Attorney General John Ashcroft, DOJ Office of Legal Counsel Deputy Assistant Attorney General John Yoo, and former Director of Central Intelligence George Tenet declined the opportunity to be interviewed for the review.

=== Origin of the program ===
In the days immediately after September 11, 2001, the NSA used its existing authorities to gather intelligence information in response to the terrorist attacks. When Director of Central Intelligence Tenet, on behalf of the White House, asked NSA Director Hayden whether the NSA could do more against terrorism, Hayden replied that nothing more could be done within existing authorities. When asked what he might do with more authority, Hayden said he put together information on what was operationally useful and technologically feasible. This information formed the basis of the PSP. Shortly thereafter, the President authorized the NSA to undertake a number of new, highly classified intelligence activities.

The specific intelligence activities that were permitted by the Presidential Authorizations were highly classified. Former White House Counsel and Attorney General Alberto Gonzales told the DOJ OIG that it was the President's decision to keep the program a "close hold." Gonzales stated that the President made the decision on all requests to "read in" any non-operational persons, including DOJ officials. Attorney General Ashcroft approved the first Presidential Authorization for the PSP as to "form and legality" on the same day that he was read into the program in October 2001.

The CIA initially prepared the threat assessment memoranda that were used to support the Presidential Authorization and periodic reauthorizations of the PSP. The memoranda documented intelligence assessments of the terrorist threats to the United States and to U.S. interests abroad from al-Qa'ida and affiliated terrorist organizations. Initially, the analysts who prepared the threat assessments were not read into the PSP and did not know how the threat assessments would be used.

"DOJ Office of Legal Counsel (OLC) Deputy Assistant Attorney General John Yoo was responsible for drafting the first series of legal memoranda supporting the program. Yoo was the only OLC official 'read into' the PSP from the program's inception in October 2001." Jay Bybee was OLC Assistant Attorney General at the time, and Yoo's supervisor. However, Bybee stated he was never read into the PSP and could shed no further light on how Yoo came to draft the OLC opinions on the program. The first OLC opinion directly supporting the legality of the PSP was dated November 2, 2001, and was drafted by Yoo.

NSA Director Hayden consulted with NSA senior technical experts and experienced attorneys from the NSA's Office of General Counsel, but only Hayden knew about and participated in the development of the Presidential Authorization by serving as a technical advisor. After the Authorization was signed, NSA attorneys supported the lawfulness of the resulting program. After Hayden received the first Authorization, he assembled 80 to 90 people in a conference room and explained what the President had authorized. Hayden said: "We're going to do exactly what he said and not one photon or electron more." According to Hayden, the program was designed to provide the NSA with the operational agility to cover terrorism-related targets.

=== Legal underpinnings ===
==== Initial justification ====
John Yoo was the sole OLC attorney who advised Attorney General Ashcroft and White House officials on the PSP from the program's inception in October 2001 through Yoo's resignation from DOJ in May 2003. Upon Yoo's departure, another DOJ official, Patrick Philbin, was selected by the White House to be read into the PSP to assume Yoo's role as advisor to the Attorney General concerning the program. In addition, Jack Goldsmith replaced Jay Bybee as the Assistant Attorney General for OLC on October 6, 2003. Even though Bybee had never been read into the PSI, Philbin persuaded Counsel to the Vice President David Addington to read in Goldsmith, Bybee's replacement. After being read into the PSP, Goldsmith and Philbin became concerned about the factual and legal basis for Yoo's legal memoranda supporting the program.

Goldsmith and Philbin began developing an analysis to more fully address the FISA statute with respect to the PSP. Beginning in August 2003, Philbin and later Goldsmith brought their concerns about the OLC legal opinions to Attorney General Ashcroft. In December 2003, Goldsmith and Philbin met with Counsel to the Vice President Addington and White House Counsel Gonzales at the White House to express their growing concerns about the legal underpinnings of the program. In late January 2004, at Goldsmith's request, the White House agreed to allow Deputy Attorney General James Comey to be read into the PSP following Comey's confirmation as the Deputy Attorney General in December 2003. After being briefed, Comey agreed that the concerns about Yoo's legal analysis were well-founded. Comey told the DOJ OIG that of particular concern to him and Goldsmith was the notion that Yoo's legal analysis entailed ignoring an act of Congress, and doing so without full congressional notification.

The DOJ OIG later concluded that it was extraordinary and inappropriate that a single DOJ attorney, John Yoo, was relied upon to conduct the initial legal assessment of the PSP, and that the lack of oversight and review of Yoo's work, as customarily is the practice of OLC, contributed to a legal analysis of the PSP that at a minimum was factually flawed. Deficiencies in the legal memoranda became apparent once additional DOJ attorneys were read into the program in 2003 and when those attorneys sought a greater understanding of the PSP's operation. The DOJ OIG concluded that the White House's strict controls over DOJ access to the PSP undermined DOJ's ability to perform its critical legal function during the PSP's early phase of operation.

==== Conflicts between DOJ and the White house ====
Comey told the DOJ OIG that he met with Attorney General Ashcroft on March 4, 2004, to discuss the PSP and that Ashcroft agreed with Comey and the other DOJ officials' assessment of the potential legal problems with the PSP. Later that day, Ashcroft was struck with severe gallstone pancreatitis and was admitted to the George Washington University Hospital in Washington, D.C. Because of Ashcroft's disability, Comey took over as Acting Attorney General.

Later on March 5, Gonzales called Goldsmith to request a letter from OLC stating that Yoo's prior OLC opinions "covered the program," meaning the PSP. Goldsmith, Philbin, and Comey re-examined Yoo's memoranda and concluded that Yoo's memoranda did not accurately describe some of the Other Intelligence Activities that were being conducted under the Presidential Authorizations implementing the PSP, and that the memoranda therefore did not provide a basis for finding that these activities were legal. On Saturday, March 6, Goldsmith and Philbin, with Comey's concurrence, met with Addington and Gonzales at the White House to convey their conclusions that certain activities in the PSP should cease.

After a series of follow-up meetings between DOJ and White House officials, the President instructed Vice President Cheney on the morning of Wednesday, March 10, to call a meeting with congressional leaders to advise them of the impasse with DOJ. A meeting with the Top administration officials, and the congressional leaders known as the Gang of Eight, but without DOJ personnel, was convened in the White House Situation Room later that day. According to Gonzales's notes of the meeting, the consensus of the congressional leaders was that the program should continue. However, after Gonzales testified before the Senate Judiciary Committee on July 24, 2007, Representative Nancy Pelosi, Senator Jay Rockefeller, and Senator Tom Daschle issued statements sharply disputing Gonzales's characterization of their statements at the March 10, 2004 meeting, stating that there was no consensus at the meeting that the program should proceed.

===== Ashcroft Hospital Bedside Meeting =====
Gonzales told the DOJ OIG that following the meeting with the congressional leaders on March 10, President Bush instructed him and Card to go to the George Washington University Hospital to speak to Ashcroft, who was in the intensive care unit recovering from surgery. At approximately 7:00 p.m. that day, Comey learned that Gonzales and Card were on their way to the hospital to see Ashcroft. He relayed this information to FBI Director Mueller, and told him that Ashcroft was in no condition to receive guests, much less make a decision about whether to recertify the PSP. Philbin said he was leaving work that evening when he received a call from Comey, who told Philbin that he needed to get to the hospital right away and to call Goldsmith and tell him what was happening.

Comey recalled that he ran up the stairs with his security detail to Ashcroft's floor, and he entered Ashcroft's room, which he described as darkened, and found Ashcroft lying in bed and his wife standing by his side. Comey said he began speaking to Ashcroft, and that it was not clear that Ashcroft could focus and that he "seemed pretty bad off." Goldsmith and Philbin arrived at the hospital within a few minutes of each other, and met with Comey in an adjacent room. Comey, Goldsmith, and Philbin later entered Ashcroft's room and, according to Goldsmith's notes, Comey and the others advised Ashcroft "not to sign anything."

When Gonzales and Card arrived, they entered Ashcroft's hospital room and stood across from Mrs. Ashcroft at the head of the bed, with Comey, Goldsmith, and Philbin behind them. Gonzales told the DOJ OIG that he carried with him in a manila envelope the March 11, 2004, Presidential authorization for Ashcroft to sign. According to Philbin, Gonzales first asked Ashcroft how he was feeling and Ashcroft replied, "Not well." Gonzales then said words to the effect, "You know, there's a reauthorization that has to be renewed ..."

Comey testified to the Senate Judiciary Committee that at this point Ashcroft told Gonzales and Card "in very strong terms" about his legal concerns with the PSP, which Comey testified Ashcroft drew from his meeting with Comey about the program a week earlier. Comey testified that Ashcroft next stated: " 'But that doesn't matter, because I'm not the Attorney General. There is the Attorney General,' and he pointed to me – I was just to his left. The two men [Gonzales and Card] did not acknowledge me; they turned and walked from the room."

Gonzales subsequently summoned Comey to the White House, and he brought United States Solicitor General Theodore Olson with him as a witness. Andy Card was also present for this meeting which took place later that evening. Gonzales told the DOJ OIG that little more was achieved at this meeting other than a general acknowledgment that a "situation" continued to exist because of the disagreement between DOJ and the White House regarding legal authorization for the program.

==== White House Counsel reauthorization ====
On the morning of March 11, 2004, with the Presidential Authorization set to expire, President Bush signed a new Authorization for the PSP. In a departure from the past practice of having the Attorney General certify the Authorization as to form and legality, the March 11 Authorization was certified by White House Counsel Gonzales. At noon on March 11, Director Mueller met with Card at the White House. According to Mueller's notes, Card told Mueller that if no "legislative fix" could be found by May 6, 2004, when the March 11 Authorization was set to expire, the program would be discontinued. Mueller wrote that he told Card that the failure to have DOJ representation at the congressional briefing and the attempt to have Ashcroft certify the Authorization without going through Comey "gave the strong perception that the [White House] was trying to do an end run around the Acting [Attorney General] whom they knew to have serious concerns as to the legality of portions of the program."

Several senior DOJ and FBI officials considered resigning after the Presidential Authorization was signed without DOJ's concurrence. Comey told the DOJ OIG that he drafted a letter of resignation because he believed it was impossible for him to remain with DOJ if the President would do something DOJ said was not legally supportable. Comey also testified that Ashcroft's Chief of Staff David Ayres believed Ashcroft also was likely to resign and thus Ayres urged Comey to wait until Ashcroft was well enough to resign with him. Goldsmith told the DOJ OIG he drafted a resignation letter at around the same time as Comey. According to his contemporaneous notes, Goldsmith cited the "shoddiness" of the prior OLC legal review, the "over-secrecy" of the PSP, and the "shameful" incident at the hospital as among his grievances.

At approximately 1:30 a.m. on March 12, 2004, FBI Director Mueller drafted by hand a letter to withdraw the FBI from participation in the program. Mueller told the DOJ OIG that he planned on having the letter typed and then tendering it, but that based on subsequent events his resignation was not necessary. Later that morning, the President met with Mueller. According to Mueller's notes, Mueller told the President of his concerns regarding the FBI's continued participation in the program, and that he was considering resigning if the FBI were directed to continue to participate without the concurrence of the Attorney General. Mueller wrote that he explained to the President that he had an "independent obligation to the FBI and to DOJ to assure the legality of actions we undertook, and that a presidential order alone could not do that." According to Mueller's notes, the President then directed Mueller to meet with Comey and other PSP principals to address the legal concerns so that the FBI could continue participating in the program "as appropriate under the law."

On March 17, 2004, the President decided to modify certain PSP intelligence-gathering activities and to discontinue certain Other Intelligence Activities that DOJ believed were legally unsupported. The President's directive was expressed in two modifications to the March 11, 2004 Presidential Authorization. On May 6, 2004, Goldsmith and Philbin completed an OLC legal memorandum assessing the legality of the PSP as it was operating at that time. The OLC memorandum stated that the Authorization for Use of Military Force (AUMF) passed by Congress shortly after the attacks of September 11, 2001 gave the President authority to use both domestically and abroad "all necessary and appropriate force," including signals intelligence capabilities, to prevent future acts of international terrorism against the United States.

==== Transfer to FISA ====
Certain activities that were originally authorized as part of the PSP have subsequently been authorized under orders issued by the Foreign Intelligence Surveillance Court (FISC). The activities transitioned in this manner included the interception of certain international communications that the President publicly described as the "Terrorist Surveillance Program." Further details regarding this transition are classified. As a result of this transition, the President decided not to reauthorize these activities and the final Presidential Authorization expired on February 1, 2007. The Protect America Act of 2007, passed in August of that year, amended FISA to address the government's ability to conduct electronic surveillance in the United States of persons reasonably believed to be located outside the United States. This legislation expired in early 2008, and in July 2008 the Foreign Intelligence Surveillance Act of 1978 Amendments Act of 2008 was enacted.

The DOJ OIG review concluded that several considerations favored initiating the process of transitioning the PSP to FISA authority earlier than had been done, especially as the program became less a temporary response to the September 11 terrorist attacks and more a permanent surveillance tool. These considerations included the PSP's effect on privacy interests of U.S. persons, the instability of the legal reasoning on which the program rested for several years, and the substantial restrictions placed on FBI agents' access to and use of program-derived information due to the highly classified status of the PSP.

==== Briefings ====
Each Presidential Authorization also included a requirement to maintain the secrecy of the activities carried out under the program. The President also noted his intention to inform appropriate members of the Senate and the House of Representatives of the program "as soon as I judge that it can be done consistently with national defense needs." According to the NSA, between October 25, 2001, and January 17, 2007, Hayden and succeeding NSA Director Keith B. Alexander, sometimes supported by other NSA personnel, conducted approximately 49 briefings to members of Congress and their staff, 17 of which took place before the December 2005 media reports regarding what was called the "Terrorist Surveillance Program." Hayden told the IGs that during the many PSP briefings to members of Congress no one ever suggested that NSA should stop the program.

From January 2002 to January 2006, only Foreign Intelligence Surveillance Court (FISC) Presiding Judge Royce C. Lamberth, followed by Presiding Judge Colleen Kollar-Kotelly, were read into the PSP. The circumstances under which the Presiding Judge was notified of the existence of the PSP and read into the program, and the measures subsequently taken to address the effect of the PSP on the government's relationship with the FISC are only revealed in the classified report.

==== Discovery issues ====
DOJ was aware as early as 2002 that information collected under the PSP could have implications for DOJ's litigation responsibilities under Federal Rules of Criminal Procedure Rule 16 and Brady v. Maryland 373 U.S. 83 (1963). Analysis of this discovery issue was first assigned to OLC Deputy Assistant Attorney General John Yoo in 2003. However, no DOJ attorneys with terrorism prosecution responsibilities were read into the PSP until mid-2004, and as a result DOJ continued to lack the advice of attorneys who were best equipped to identify and examine the discovery issues in connection with the PSP. The steps taken since then to address discovery issues with respect to the PSP are discussed only in the classified report. The DOJ may need to re-examine past cases to see whether potentially discoverable but undisclosed Rule 16 or Brady material was collected under the PSP, to ensure that it has complied with its discovery obligations in such cases.

==== Effectiveness ====
The IGs also examined the impact of PSP information on counterterrorism efforts. Many senior IC officials believe that the PSP filled a gap in intelligence collection thought to exist under the FISA statute shortly after the al-Qa'ida terrorist attacks against the United States. Others within the IC, including FBI agents, CIA analysts and officers, and other officials had difficulty evaluating the precise contribution of the PSP to counterterrorism efforts because it was most often viewed as one source among many available analytic and intelligence-gathering tools in these efforts. The IG reports describe several examples of how PSP-derived information factored into specific investigations and operations.

During the May 2006 Senate hearing on his nomination to be CIA Director, Hayden said that, had the PSP been in place before the September 2001 attacks, hijackers Khalid al-Mihdhar and Nawaf al-Hazmi almost certainly would have been identified and located. In May 2009, Hayden told NSA OIG that the value of the Program was in knowing that NSA signals intelligence activities under the PSP covered an important "quadrant" of terrorist communications. NSA's Deputy Director echoed Hayden's comment when he said that the value of the PSP was in the confidence it provided that someone was looking at the seam between the foreign and domestic intelligence domains.

The DOJ OIG found that the exceptionally compartmented nature of the program created some frustration for FBI personnel. Some agents and analysts criticized the PSP-derived information they received for providing insufficient details, and the agents who managed counterterrorism programs at the FBI field offices the DOJ OIG visited said the FBI's process for disseminating PSP-derived information failed to adequately prioritize the information for investigation. In sum, the DOJ OIG found it difficult to assess or quantify the overall effectiveness of the PSP program as it relates to the FBI's counterterrorism activities. However, based on the interviews conducted and documents reviewed, the DOJ OIG concluded that although PSP-derived information had value in some counterterrorism investigations, it generally played a limited role in the FBI's overall counterterrorism efforts.

The CIA OIG determined that several factors hindered the CIA in making full use of the product of the PSP. Many CIA officials stated that too few CIA personnel at the working level were read into the PSP. The CIA OIG determined that the CIA did not implement procedures to assess the usefulness of the product of the PSP and did not routinely document whether particular PSP reporting had contributed to successful counterterrorism operations. In a May 2006 briefing to the Senate Select Committee on Intelligence, a senior CIA official said that PSP reporting was rarely the sole basis for an intelligence success, but that it frequently played a supporting role.

=== Reaction ===
Speaker of the House of Representatives Nancy Pelosi (D-Calif.), issued a statement on the day the report was released saying, "no president should be able to operate outside the law." She was responding specifically to a statement in the report attributed to former Deputy Attorney General James B. Comey that, "Yoo's legal analysis entailed ignoring an act of Congress, and doing so without full congressional notification." Pelosi further stated that, "the House Judiciary and Intelligence Committees will closely examine the findings and recommendations of the classified and unclassified reports, and will conduct appropriate oversight of electronic surveillance activities."

John Conyers Jr. (D-Mich.), House Judiciary Committee Chairman, made the following comments in an official statement on the day the report was released: "This report, mandated by Congress last year, documents what many of us in Congress concluded long ago: President Bush’s warrantless surveillance program was illegal from the beginning, and of questionable value. It clearly violated the Foreign Intelligence Surveillance Act (FISA), which regulates domestic surveillance for intelligence purposes, and was based on legal analysis that was 'factually flawed'.... The refusal of key Bush administration officials such as David Addington and John Yoo to cooperate with the IGs’ review underscores the need for an independent commission with subpoena power to further review these issues, as I have called for."

Conyers' counterpart on the Senate Judiciary Committee, Patrick Leahy (D-Vt.), issued a statement on the report saying its conclusions should highlight rule-of-law issues ignored by the previous administration. Leahy said, "This report underscores why we should move forward with a nonpartisan commission of inquiry. Without a thorough, independent review of decisions that run counter to our laws and treaties, we cannot ensure that these same mistakes are not repeated. Such a commission must have bipartisan support to be able to truly get to the bottom of these issues with objectivity and credibility."

Shortly after the report was released, former NSA Director Michael Hayden, who designed and implemented the program in 2001, told the Associated Press that he personally briefed key members of congress on the program. He maintained that the members were kept well-informed, and was distressed by suggestions that they were not. Hayden said key members of the House Permanent Select Committee on Intelligence and Senate Select Committee on Intelligence of both parties were briefed about four times a year, but admitted that the number of lawmakers informed was intentionally limited as the program was highly classified.

== Timeline ==
- 2001-09-11: September 11 Attacks kill approximately 3,000 people in the U.S.
- 2001-10-25: First Congressional briefing on the surveillance program
- 2001-11-02: Date of first OLC opinion directly supporting the legality of the PSP (drafted by John Yoo)
- 2002-12-11: Yoo drafts another opinion concerning the PSP using the same basic analysis contained in his November 2, 2001 memo
- 2003-03: Yoo's supervisor Jay Bybee resigns as the Assistant Attorney General for the OLC, to become a U.S. Court of Appeals judge
- 2003-05: Yoo resigns from DOJ
- 2003-10-06: Jack Goldsmith replaces Jay Bybee as the Assistant Attorney General for OLC
- 2003-12: Goldsmith and Patrick Philbin meet with David Addington, and Alberto Gonzales to express their concerns
- 2004-01: Goldsmith's request for the new Deputy AG James Comey to be read into the PSP is granted by Addington
- 2004-02-19: Michael Hayden and Vito Potenza from NSA meet with Comey to read him into the program in the Justice Department's SCIF
- 2004-02-19: Hayden tells Comey, "I'm so glad you're getting read in, because now I won't be alone at the [witness] table when John Kerry is elected president"
- 2004-03-01: Comey discusses DOJ's concerns about the legality of the program with FBI Director Robert Mueller
- 2004-03-04: Comey meets with Attorney General John Ashcroft to discuss his concerns on the legality of the PSP
- 2004-03-04: Attorney General Ashcroft is hospitalized that evening
- 2004-03-05: Comey takes over as Acting Attorney General
- 2004-03-05: Gonzales calls Goldsmith to request letter reaffirming Yoo's prior OLC opinions
- 2004-03-06: Goldsmith and Philbin meet with Addington and Gonzales at the White House to tell them that certain activities in the PSP should cease.
- 2004-03-07: Goldsmith and Philbin meet again with Addington and Gonzales at the White House.
- 2004-03-09: Gonzales calls Goldsmith to the White House in an effort to persuade him that his criticisms of Yoo's memoranda were incorrect
- 2004-03-09: Another meeting at the White House is held with Comey, Goldsmith, and Philbin present
- 2004-03-10: Comey learns his old friend, then Deputy National Security Advisor Frances Townsend, is not read in, so he cannot consult her.
- 2004-03-10: Goldsmith, Philbin, and Comey meet to discuss the meeting at the White House the day before and how DOJ should proceed
- 2004-03-10: Vice President Dick Cheney decides to get personally involved in the reauthorization
- 2004-03-10: Gonzales, Cheney, Card, Hayden, and others, convene an "emergency meeting" with the Gang of Eight in the White House Situation Room
- 2004-03-10: Comey, Goldsmith, and Philbin rush to the hospital to tell Ashcroft not to sign anything
- 2004-03-10: Gonzales and Card enter Ashcroft's hospital room with the March 11, 2004, Presidential Authorization for Ashcroft to sign
- 2004-03-10: Ashcroft tells Gonzales and Card "in very strong terms" about his legal concerns with the PSP and refers them to Comey
- 2004-03-10: Gonzales and Card leave the hospital and then summon Comey to the White House before he had left
- 2004-03-10: Goldsmith calls his deputy at OLC M. Edward Whelan III and tells him to go to the office to draft a resignation letter for him, without explanation
- 2004-03-10: After calling Comey, Card learns that top Justice staff are planning to resign
- 2004-03-10: Comey brings Theodore Olson to the White House at about 11:00 p.m. to witness the meeting with Gonzales and Card
- 2004-03-10: Card confronts Comey over the resignation rumor, and learns that Comey is planning to resign
- 2004-03-11: Addington re-types the code-word-classified Presidential authorization, replacing the signature line for Ashcroft with Gonzales
- 2004-03-11: President George W. Bush signs a new Authorization for the PSP certified by White House Counsel Gonzales instead of the Attorney General
- 2004-03-11: After learning the PSP was reauthorized, Comey types a resignation letter, but holds it at the request of Ashcroft's Chief of Staff David Ayres
- 2004-03-12: Mueller drafts a resignation letter
- 2004-03-12: National Security Advisor Condoleezza Rice suggests that President Bush talk directly to Comey to "hear him out"
- 2004-03-12: At the end of his daily briefing, Bush calls Comey aside, and asks him wait another 45 days, but Comey declines
- 2004-03-12: After learning from Comey that Mueller plans to resign, Bush meets with him privately and tells Mueller to tell Comey to do what "needs to be done."
- 2004-03-16: Comey drafts a memorandum to White House Counsel Gonzales setting out his advice to the President. Gonzales sends a dismissive reply
- 2004-03-17: Bush modifies some PSP intelligence-gathering activities and discontinues others that DOJ believed not were legally supported
- 2004-03-31: Ashcroft is cleared by his doctors to resume his duties as Attorney General
- 2004-05-06: Goldsmith and Philbin complete an OLC legal memorandum assessing the legality of the PSP as it was operating at that time
- 2004-05-06: The March 11 Authorization is set to expire
- 2004-11-02: George W. Bush is re-elected President of the United States
- 2005-12-16: The New York Times publishes the first article describing NSA warrantless wiretaps
- 2005-12-17: President Bush describes the TSP in a radio address
- 2005-12-19: Gonzales & Hayden discuss legal issues around the TSP in a joint press conference
- 2006-07-18: Gonzales testifies before the Senate Judiciary Committee
- 2007-02-01: The President decides not to reauthorize these activities and the final Presidential Authorization expires
- 2007-07-24: Gonzales testifies before the Senate Judiciary Committee about the March 10, 2004, "Gang of Eight" briefing
- 2007-08-05: The Protect America Act is enacted, amending FISA to address the government's ability to conduct domestic electronic surveillance
- 2008-02-17: The Protect America Act expires
- 2008-07-10: The FISA Amendments Act of 2008 is enacted, providing broader authority than the acknowledged TSP scope
- 2009-07-10: Inspectors General report required under FISA Amendments Act is released
