= CPNI =

CPNI may refer to:

- Centre for the Protection of National Infrastructure
- Communist Party of Northern Ireland
- Customer proprietary network information
