= Defense of Democracies =

American nonprofit organization

- Formation: February 2008; 18 years ago
- Type: 501(c)(4) non-profit
- Purpose: Lobbying, national security legislation
- Region served: United States

Defense of Democracies is a non-profit organization created in February 2008 to lobby the U.S. House of Representatives to approve the updated Foreign Intelligence Surveillance Act passed by the U.S. Senate. The organization has spent over US$3 million on television and radio ad campaign to targeted members of Congress in 16 U.S. congressional districts and has run ads on cable television nationwide.

== Background ==
The bill would extend the Protect America Act of 2007 and make it easier for the government to wiretap Americans. It also would give retroactive legal immunity to U.S. telecom companies that cooperated with U.S. President George Walker Bush's secret warrantless wiretapping program which was enacted prior to 9/11.

== Donors ==
Organized under section 501(c)(4) of the U.S. tax code, the new group is not required to publicly disclose its donors, and it has no plans to do so.

== Targets ==
Targets of the ads include Democratic Representatives Kirsten Gillibrand and Michael Arcuri of New York, Tim Mahoney of Florida, Joe Courtney and Chris Murphy of Connecticut, Nancy Boyda of Kansas, and Tim Walz of Minnesota.

== Results ==
The House passed a modified version of the bill, the FISA Amendments Act of 2008, in June 2008.
