= Pattern-of-life analysis =

Method of surveillance

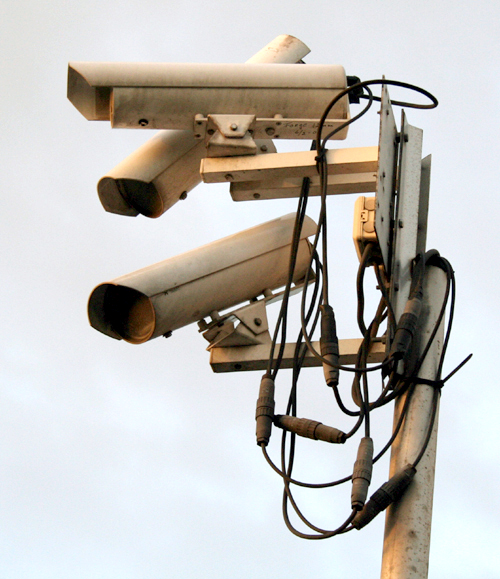
Surveillance cameras track everyday movement in cities all across the world.

Pattern-of-life analysis is a method of surveillance that documents or understands the habits of a person or population. Motives may include security, profit, scientific research, regular censuses, and traffic analysis. The data of interest may reflect anything in a person or persons' life: their travels, purchases, internet browsing habits, choices, and so forth. The data is used to predict a subject's future action or to detect anomalous behavior.

== Notable examples ==
=== Esri's use of ArcGIS ===
Esri is an international supplier of Geographic Information System (GIS) software, web GIS and geodatabase management applications. Esri uses the name ArcGIS to refer to its suite of GIS software products, which operate on desktop, server, and mobile platforms. The term GIS describes any information system that integrates, stores, edits, analyzes, shares and displays geographic information for informing decision making. With this technology, the company's goal is to unify information of a subject's life habits and their geographical whereabouts with statistics related to IED casualties in an effort to predict and prevent another IED incident from happening. In one presentation used at an Esri Federal User Conference, it states: "Exploitation of a cell's network enables a commander with the right tools to get 'Left of Boom' [i.e. before an IED or bomb detonates]."

=== MARINA ===
MARINA is an NSA database and analysis toolset for intercepted Internet metadata (DNI in NSA terminology). The database stores metadata up to a year. According to documents leaked by Edward Snowden: "The Marina metadata application tracks a user's browser experience, gathers contact information/content and develops summaries of target" and "[o]f the more distinguishing features, Marina has the ability to look back on the last 365 days' worth of DNI metadata seen by the Sigint collection system, regardless whether or not it was tasked for collection." [Emphasis in original NSA document.] The stored metadata is mainly used for pattern-of-life analysis. US persons are not exempt because metadata is not considered data by US law (section 702 of the FISA Amendments Act).

MARINA's phone counterpart is MAINWAY.

=== Wide-Area Motion Imagery ===
Wide-area motion imagery (WAMI) generates high-resolution images to enable tracking and recording of vehicle and pedestrian movements over city-sized areas. Pattern of life (POL) or behavior pattern describes a recurrent (e.g., normalcy) way of acting by an individual or group toward a given object or in a given situation. Usually, one has a specific POL, and this POL is repeatable. Full motion video or WAMI data with extracted tracks can be used for POL analysis.

== See also ==
- Database
- Information privacy
- Location-based service
- MARINA
- Mass surveillance
- Social network analysis
- Telecommunications data retention
- Traffic analysis
