= Answer-seizure ratio =

The answer-seizure ratio (ASR) is a measurement of network quality and call success rates in telecommunication. It is the percentage of answered telephone calls with respect to the total call volume.

== Definition ==
In telecommunication an attempted call is termed a seizure. The answer-seizure ratio is defined as 100 times the number of answered calls, i.e. the number of seizures resulting in an answer signal, divided by the total number of seizures:

$ASR = 100 \ \frac {answered \ calls}{seized \ calls}$

For example, if there were 156 calls dialed of which 62 were successfully connected, then:

ASR (%) = (62 [successful calls] / 156 [dialed calls]) x 100 = 39.74%

Busy signals and other call rejections by the telephone network count as call failures. However, the inclusion in the ASR accounting of some failed calls varies in practical applications. This makes the ASR highly dependent on end-user action. Low answer-seizure ratios may be caused by far-end switch congestion, not answering by called parties and busy destination circuits.

An exceptionally good ASR score would be 60% or above. 40% – 50% is considered acceptable. Anything below 40% is considered quite poor.

== See also ==
- Network Effectiveness Ratio
- Call detail record
- Average call duration
