= Network effectiveness ratio =

Measure of the ability of a network to deliver a call to the called terminal

In telecommunications, the network effectiveness ratio (NER) measures the ability of a network to deliver a call to the called terminal. Busy signals and other call failure due to user behaviour are counted as "successful call delivery" for NER calculation purposes. Unlike ASR, NER excludes the effects of customer and terminal behaviour. NER is a measure of network quality defined by the ITU.

$NER = 100 \ \frac {Answered\ calls \ + \ User\ Busy \ + \ Ring\ No\ Answer \ + \ Terminal\ Reject }{Total Calls}$

In general, the NER is used to calculate the effectiveness of the internal interconnect routes.

== See also ==
- ASR : Answer/Nb address complete message
- ABR : Answer/Nb of initial address message
