= Call detail record =

Record that documents a telephone call

A call detail record (CDR) is a data record produced by a telephone exchange or other telecommunications equipment that documents the details of a telephone call or other telecommunications transactions (e.g., text message) that passes through that facility or device. The record contains various attributes of the call, such as time, duration, completion status, source number, and destination number. It is the automated equivalent of the paper toll tickets that were written and timed by operators for long-distance calls in a manual telephone exchange.

== CDR contents ==
A call detail record contains data fields that describe a specific instance of a telecommunication transaction, but does not include the content of that transaction. By way of simplistic example, a call detail record describing a particular phone call might include the phone numbers of both the calling and receiving parties, the start time, and duration of that call. In actual modern practice, call detail records are much more detailed, and contain attributes such as:

- the phone number of the subscriber originating the call (calling party, A-party)
- the phone number receiving the call (called party, B-party)
- the starting time of the call (date and time)
- the call duration
- the billing phone number that is charged for the call
- the identification of the telephone exchange or equipment writing the record
- a unique sequence number identifying the record
- additional digits on the called number used to route or charge the call
- the disposition or the results of the call, indicating, for example, whether or not the call was connected
- the route by which the call entered the exchange
- the route by which the call left the exchange
- call type (voice, SMS, etc.)
- voice call type (call setup, call continue, call operation, call end, call idle, call busy, out of service call)
- any fault condition encountered

Each exchange manufacturer decides which information is emitted on the tickets and how it is formatted. Examples:

- Send the timestamp of the end of call instead of duration
- Voice-only machines may not send call type
- Some small PBX does not send the calling party

In some corporate private branch exchange (PBX) systems, a call detail record is termed a station messaging detail record (SMDR).

== Uses ==
Call detail records serve a variety of functions. For telephone service providers, they are critical to the production of revenue, in that they provide the basis for the generation of telephone bills. For law enforcement, call detail records provide a wealth of information that can help to identify suspects, in that they can reveal details as to an individual's relationships with associates, communication and behavior patterns, and even location data that can establish the whereabouts of an individual during the entirety of the call. For companies with PBX telephone systems, call detail records provide a means of tracking long-distance access, can monitor telephone usage by department or office, and can create listing of incoming and outgoing calls.

== Privacy ==
The U.S. Supreme Court has held the records of numbers called are not protected by the Fourth Amendment to the Constitution of the United States because the caller "voluntarily conveyed numerical information to the telephone company." But there is limited protection under the Electronic Communications Privacy Act. The revelation that call metadata records are being universally collected and stored in the U.S. and elsewhere has generated considerable controversy.

In June 2013, a top secret order of the United States Foreign Intelligence Surveillance Court was leaked to the public. That order referenced and defined call detail records as follows:

"IT IS HEREBY ORDERED that, the Custodian of Records shall produce to the National Security Agency (NSA) upon service of this Order, and continue production on an ongoing daily basis thereafter for the duration of this Order, unless ordered by the Court, an electronic copy of the following tangible things: all call detail records or "telephony metadata" created by Verizon for communications (i) between the United States and abroad; or (ii) wholly within the United States, including local telephone calls.... "Telephony metadata includes comprehensive communications routing information, including but not limited to session identifying information (e.g., originating and terminating telephone number, International Mobile Subscriber Identity (IMSI) number, International Mobile station Equipment Identity (IMEI) number, etc.), trunk identifier, telephone calling card numbers, and time and duration of call. Telephony metadata does not include the substantive content of any communication, as defined by 18 U.S.C. § 2510(8), or the name, address, or financial information of a subscriber or customer."

== Usage in research ==
CDRs have found various uses in academic research, with topics ranging from social networks to human mobility.

== See also ==
- Charging data record
- Customer proprietary network information
- NSA call database
- Telecommunications data retention
- Pen register
- Internet Protocol Detail Record
- Communications data
- Datacom
- Average call duration
- Answer/seizure ratio
- Telecommunication transaction processing systems
