= MARINA =

Surveillance software

MARINA is an NSA database and analysis toolset for intercepted Internet metadata (DNI in NSA terminology). The database stores metadata up to a year. According to documents leaked by Edward Snowden:

The Marina metadata application tracks a user's browser experience, gathers contact information/content and develops summaries of target ... [o]f the more distinguishing features, Marina has the ability to look back on the last 365 days' worth of DNI metadata seen by the SIGINT collection system, regardless whether or not it was tasked for collection. [Emphasis in original NSA document.]

The stored metadata is mainly used for pattern-of-life analysis. US persons are not exempt because metadata is not considered data by US law (section 702 of the FISA Amendments Act).

MARINA's phone counterpart is MAINWAY.
