= ACD (telecommunications company) =

Internet service provider based in Lansing, Michigan

- Type: Private
- Industry: Telecommunications, Datacenter, Fiber Optic
- Founded: 1986
- Headquarters: 1800 N Grand River Ave Lansing, MI 48906
- Key people: Kevin Schoen, Founder & CEO
- Number of employees: 110
- Website: www.acd.net

ACD is a Competitive Local Exchange Carrier and Internet service provider, headquartered in Lansing, Michigan. ACD provides Fiber Optic Service, Metro Ethernet, Telephone, Hosted Phone Service, DSL, Datacenter and Web hosting services to all types of customers.

== History ==
ACD was founded as ACD Computers in 1986 by Kevin Schoen. ACD built and sold their own computer systems through the 1990s. In 1994 ACD became an Internet service provider, selling dial-up, hosting and other Internet Services. ACD Telecom, Inc., which is part of ACD obtained CLEC license in early 2000. ACD then deployed equipment into 7 Central Offices in the Lansing and Jackson Michigan markets, and started providing facilities based DSL, T1, Fiber and Phone Services. The company has since expanded to most of Lower Michigan.

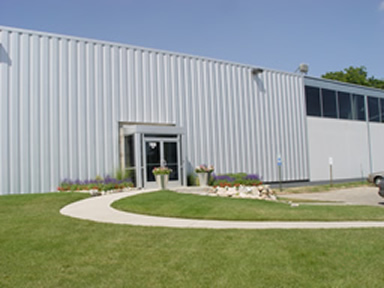
ACD.net Headquarters

== Distributed Antenna System and Fiber Optic Network ==
ACD owns a Midwest fiber optic and distributed antenna system (DAS). This system serves businesses and residential customers. This network offers gigabit Ethernet service to businesses. Fiber optic service is 50 to 100 times faster than cable modem service and DSL.

The next generation of broadband consists of fiber optic cable deployed to business and residential customers.

== Wifi Deployment ==
ACD was provided with a US$750,000 grant by the Housing and Urban Development under a test project to deploy Wifi Service covering a 8-square-mile (21 km^{2}) area in Springfield, Michigan. As part of the agreement, ACD was required to provide subsidized internet access for a period of 3 years after the deployment, which was completed in spring of 2009.

== Datacenter ==
The company has a 40,000-square-foot (3,700 m^{2}) datacenter in North Lansing that also serves as its headquarters, and was constructed in 2006.

== Security Systems ==
ACD provides security systems to municipalities over its broadband network.

== Fiber Networks and Broadband Stimulus Projects ==
ACD provides services including gigabit Ethernet and SONET services. It has a construction arm that builds fiber networks.

ACD was awarded two rounds of federal funding for construction of fiber networks in more rural counties in Michigan.

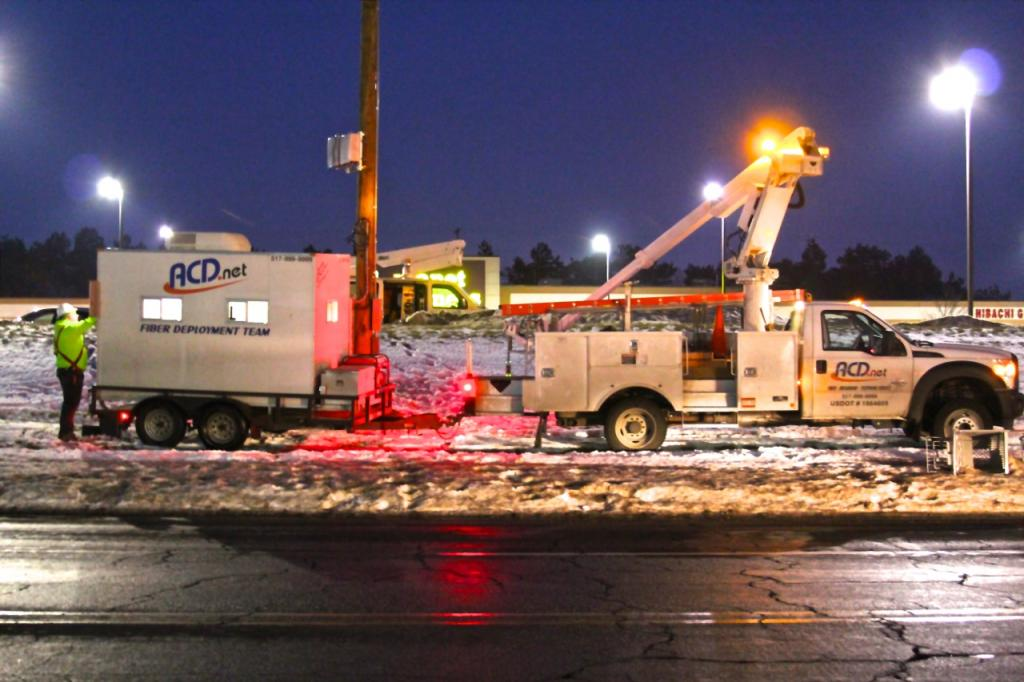
ACD.net fiber network construction

== Speed Up Midwest ==
This project was created to increase broadband speeds. Local tech firms working with local and state governments can create Midwest Gigabit Cities. Over 1,100 communities applied for the Google Fiber network (creating gigabit cities). It was first turned on in Kansas City in 2012, and expanded to Provo Utah in January 2014.

== News coverage ==
1. Datacenter Map http://www.datacentermap.com/company/acd-net.html
2. GE Mapsite https://web.archive.org/web/20150220205301/http://www.gemapsight.com/blog/acd-net-obtains-joint-use-permits-faster-while-reducing-pole-inspection-costs/
3. Vimeo videos https://vimeo.com/tag:acd.net
4. Lansing Fiber Networks https://web.archive.org/web/20150317173220/http://www.lansingcitypulse.com/lansing/article-10968-the-speed-of-light.html
5. Hillsdale Fiber Optic Cables http://www.hillsdalecollegian.com/2014/11/fiber-optic-cables-are-kind-of-retro-if-hillsdale-gets-more-bandwidth-it-may-attract-more-entrepreneurs/
6. Hillsdale a deployment city for Gigabit Broadband http://www.hillsdale.net/article/20141016/News/141019315
7. Hillsdale proceeds with plan to build new fiber network http://www.hillsdale.net/article/20140714/News/140719625
8. Lansing-Based ACD Launches New Wireless Network in Springfield http://www.capitalgainsmedia.com/innovationnews/acd0316.aspx
9. ACD Expands Territory Beyond Lansing to Founders’ Hometown of Howell http://www.capitalgainsmedia.com/innovationnews/ACD0332.aspx
10. Zhone: Line-driven “N” MuniFi http://www.dailywireless.org/2008/06/10/7840/
11. Springfield, Michigan launches municipal Wi-Fi service http://www.muniwireless.com/2008/08/01/springfield-michigan-launches-municipal-wi-fi-service/
12. Downtown Lansing Gets New Technology Employer https://web.archive.org/web/20110714103022/http://www.mitechnews.com/articles.asp?id=5591
13. Downtown prepares for Wi-Fi service
14. Newly installed fiber optics service in Franklin bringing faster speeds http://www.theoaklandpress.com/general-news/20140723/newly-installed-fiber-optics-service-in-franklin-bringing-faster-speeds
15. Village of Franklin becomes a ‘Fiber Hood’ http://www.theoaklandpress.com/business/20140721/village-of-franklin-becomes-a-fiber-hood
16. HBPU proceeds with fiber optic plans http://www.hillsdale.net/article/20140714/News/140719625
17. ACD builds fiber network, improves local Internet coverage https://web.archive.org/web/20141016074032/http://m.ourmidland.com/mobile/news/acd-net-builds-fiber-network-improves-local-internet-coverage/article_d9d4a9d9-0019-53ec-8cb8-0002d9a267df.html
18. Fiber optic network project underway in Boyne http://www.boynegazette.com/2014/fiber-optic-network-project-underway-in-boyne/uncategorized/68962
19. Planning Commission approves four, 40-foot cell towers in city https://web.archive.org/web/20160119123610/http://www.twinsburgbulletin.com/news%20local/2014/10/16/planning-commission-approves-four-40-foot-cell-towers-in-city
20. ACD Obtains Joint Use Permits Faster While Reducing Pole Inspection Costs https://web.archive.org/web/20150220205301/http://www.gemapsight.com/blog/acd-net-obtains-joint-use-permits-faster-while-reducing-pole-inspection-costs/
21. ACD Thrives in New Location https://web.archive.org/web/20150220204752/http://lansingbusinessnews.com/articles/103-2007-april/497-acdnet-thrives-in-new-location.html
22. ACD continues long history of consistent growth http://www.capitalgainsmedia.com/innovationnews/ACD0644.aspx
23. Fiber optic company expands into Port Huron http://www.thetimesherald.com/story/news/local/2015/04/08/fiber-optic-company-expands-port-huron/25491611/
