= Activity cycle diagram =

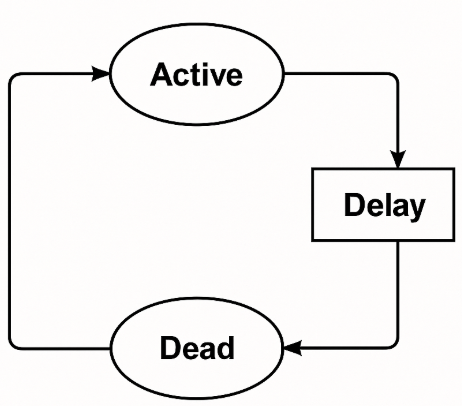
Illustrative activity cycle diagram

An activity cycle diagram (ACD) is a graphical modeling tool used to depict interactions among objects within a system. It is commonly used in the field of discrete event simulation, following the activity-based modeling paradigm.

This approach models how system components move between different states over time—most commonly "active" and "dead"—focusing on their life cycles. For example, in a hospital simulation, a patient may alternate between waiting (dead state) and receiving treatment (active state). In contrast, a process-oriented or event-based model would define the patient's journey as a sequence of steps—such as "check-in," "wait," "treatment," and "discharge"—emphasizing the flow of control rather than the states of system components.

Activity-based modeling is often considered a natural and intuitive way to represent system behavior over time.

== Origin ==
The ACD was developed in the 1960s, building on the flow diagram method introduced by K. D. Tocher. It was created to support activity-based modeling in simulation and has since been applied across various domains.

== Characteristics ==
An activity cycle diagram focuses on the life cycle of system components, distinguishing between a "dead" state (idle, not engaged in any activity) and an "active" state (engaged in a process or function). These diagrams are used to model how entities in a system move between these states over time.

== Implementation ==
In activity-based modeling, system dynamics are represented as a network model of the logical and temporal relationships among activities. This makes the ACD well-suited for use with the activity scanning method of simulation execution, which involves continuously checking the system to determine which activities are ready to occur.
