= Autoregressive conditional duration =

In financial econometrics, an autoregressive conditional duration (ACD, Engle and Russell (1998)) model considers irregularly spaced and autocorrelated intertrade durations. ACD is analogous to GARCH. In a continuous double auction (a common trading mechanism in many financial markets) waiting times between two consecutive trades vary at random.

== Definition ==
Let $~\tau_t~$ denote the duration (the waiting time between consecutive trades) and assume that $~\tau_t=\theta_t z_t ~$, where $z_t$ are independent and identically distributed random variables, positive and with $\operatorname{E}(z_t) = 1$ and where the series $~\theta_t~$ is given by:

$\theta_t = \alpha_0 + \alpha_1 \tau_{t-1} + \cdots + \alpha_q \tau_{t-q} + \beta_1 \theta_{t-1} + \cdots + \beta_p\theta_{t-p} = \alpha_0 + \sum_{i=1}^q \alpha_i \tau_{t-i} + \sum_{i=1}^p \beta_i \theta_{t-i}$

and where $~\alpha_0>0~$, $\alpha_i\ge 0$, $\beta_i \ge 0$, $~i>0$.
