= Average call duration =

The average call duration (ACD) is a measurement in telecommunications that reflects an average length of telephone calls transmitted on telecommunication networks. It may be calculated by dividing the total length of calls by the number of calls.

The measurement is typically based on the reporting by telecommunication equipment via call detail records. Samples are collected to determine traffic demand and forecast call volumes, serving also as a tool for infrastructure monitoring of switches and cables. Depending on the type of call being made, ACD can be used as a proxy measure of call quality.

== See also ==
- Answer-seizure ratio (ASR)
- Erlang (unit)
- Mean opinion score (MOS)
- Perceptual Evaluation of Speech Quality (PESQ)
