= Australasian College of Dermatologists =

Specialist medical college in Sydney, Australia

- Abbreviation: ACD
- Formation: 1967
- Legal status: Non-profit
- Purpose: Education, training, standards and advocacy of dermatologists
- Headquarters: Sydney
- Location: Australia
- Region served: Australia and New Zealand
- Members: Doctors
- President: Dr Adrian Lim
- Staff: 22
- Website: www.dermcoll.edu.au

The Australasian College of Dermatologists (ACD) is an accredited specialist medical college comprising medical practitioners with specialist training in dermatology.

== About ==
The Australasian College of Dermatologists was founded in 1967. There are currently over 550 Fellows of the College and over 100 registrars (doctors in training).

The ACD is the only recognised body for training as a dermatologist in Australia. It is a member of the Council of Presidents of Medical Colleges.

Australia and New Zealand have relatively high rates of both melanoma and non-melanoma skin cancer, thought to be due to combinations of fair-skinned population, temperate to subtropical locations and outdoor lifestyle with high sun exposure.

== History ==
Traditionally dermatology training was undertaken as part of General Physician training. In the 1960s, dermatologists in NSW and Victoria thought that a separate College was warranted.

The College was inaugurated as the Australian College of Dermatologists on 1 May 1967.

== Fellowship ==
Candidates complete a four-year fellowship to be admitted as a Fellow of the ACD.

Dermatologists are medical specialists and should be differentiated from primary-care doctors who work at "skin screening" clinics. All specialist dermatologists have a very high level of training and practice experience in their field. There is less regulation of primary-care skin clinics where quality and experience may therefore vary.

In New Zealand, advanced training in dermatology can be done through the Royal Australasian College of Physicians.

== Publications ==
The ACD publishes The Australasian Journal of Dermatology and position statements (e.g. "Sun Protection and Sunscreen").
