= FISA of 1978 Amendments Act of 2008 =

United States law

Foreign Intelligence Surveillance Act of 1978 Amendments Act of 2008
- Long title: An Act to amend the Foreign Intelligence Surveillance Act of 1978 to establish a procedure for authorizing certain acquisitions of foreign intelligence, and for other purposes.
- Nicknames: FISA Amendments Act of 2008
- Enacted by: the 110th United States Congress
- Effective: July 10, 2008

Citations
- Public law: 110-261
- Statutes at Large: 122 Stat. 2436

Codification
- Acts amended: Foreign Intelligence Surveillance Act; USA PATRIOT Act; Protect America Act of 2007
- Titles amended: 50 U.S.C.: War and National Defense
- U.S.C. sections amended: 50 U.S.C. ch. 36, subch. I § 1801 et seq.

Legislative history
- Introduced in the House as H.R. 6304 by Silvestre Reyes (D–TX) on June 19, 2008; Committee consideration by House Judiciary, House Intelligence (Permanent Select); Passed the House on June 20, 2008 (293–129 Roll call vote 437, via Clerk.House.gov); Passed the Senate on July 9, 2008 (69–28 Roll call vote 168, via Senate.gov); Signed into law by President George W. Bush on July 10, 2008

Major amendments
- USA Freedom Act

The FISA Amendments Act of 2008, also called the FAA and Foreign Intelligence Surveillance Act of 1978 Amendments Act of 2008, is an Act of Congress that amended the Foreign Intelligence Surveillance Act. It has been used as the legal basis for surveillance programs disclosed by Edward Snowden in 2013, including PRISM.

== Background ==
Warrantless wiretapping by the National Security Agency (NSA) was revealed publicly in late 2005 by The New York Times and then reportedly discontinued in January 2007. See Letter from Attorney-General Alberto Gonzales to Senators Patrick Leahy and Arlen Specter, CONG. REC. S646-S647 (January 17, 2007). By 2008 approximately forty lawsuits had been filed against telecommunications companies by groups and individuals alleging that the Bush administration illegally monitored their phone calls or e-mails.

The Foreign Intelligence Surveillance Act makes it illegal to intentionally engage in electronic surveillance under appearance of an official act or to disclose or use information obtained by electronic surveillance under appearance of an official act knowing that it was not authorized by statute; this is punishable with a fine of up to $10,000 or up to five years in prison, or both. In addition, the Wiretap Act prohibits any person from illegally intercepting, disclosing, using, or divulging phone calls or electronic communications; this is punishable with a fine or up to five years in prison, or both.

== Title VII ==
The FISA Amendments Act also added a new Title VII to FISA which contained provisions similar, but not identical to, provisions in the Protect America Act of 2007 which had expired earlier in 2008. The new provisions in Title VII of FISA were scheduled to expire on December 31, 2012, but two days before the U.S. Senate extended the FISA Amendments Act for five years, which renewed the U.S. government's authority to monitor electronic communications of foreigners abroad. In January 2018 this was extended by six more years.

=== Section 702: Non U.S. persons ===
Section 702 permits the Attorney General and the Director of National Intelligence to jointly authorize targeting of non-US persons reasonably believed to be located outside the United States.

By targeting, it is meant that US persons or persons located in the United States may not be the intended targets of the collection. The targeting must have as its object the acquisition of foreign intelligence information, as this is defined by FISA.

This does not mean the communications of US persons can not be collected, as they are subject to what is known as incidental collection under some circumstances, such as when they communicate with non-US persons who are the targets of the collection.

Under § 702(b) of the FISA Amendments Act, acquisitions are subject to several limitations.

Specifically, an acquisition:

- May not intentionally target any person known at the time of acquisition to be located in the United States;
- May not intentionally target a person reasonably believed to be located outside the United States if the purpose of such acquisition is to target a particular, known person reasonably believed to be in the United States;
- May not intentionally target a U.S. person reasonably believed to be located outside the United States;
- May not intentionally acquire any communication as to which the sender and all intended recipients are known at the time of the acquisition to be located in the United States;
- Must be conducted in a manner consistent with the Fourth Amendment to the United States Constitution.

Section 702 certifications are authorized annually. There are some differences from the traditional Title I FISA process. The certifications are authorized based on categories of information that are subject to the collection and meet the definition of foreign intelligence information. The authorized certifications include international terrorism, acquisition of weapons of mass destruction and other topics.

Section 702 authorizes foreign surveillance programs by the National Security Agency (NSA), like PRISM and some earlier data collection activities which were previously authorized under the President's Surveillance Program from 2001.

The United States Foreign Intelligence Surveillance Court (FISA Court) ruled that the FBI used the identifiers of 16,000 persons though the FBI could legally justify only seven based on the required foreign intelligence or crime-fighting purposes. There were queries that were not reasonably likely to retrieve foreign-intelligence information or evidence of crime, such as queries to vet a potential source, candidates for local police, college students participating in a "Collegiate Academy", and of individuals who had visited the FBI office. It also noted other instances of noncompliance.

=== Section 704: U.S. persons outside the United States ===
Section 704 permits the Foreign Intelligence Surveillance Court to authorize surveillance targeting US persons outside the United States to acquire foreign intelligence information. Unlike Section 702, Section 704 requires an order from the FISA Court. This is claimed as an "additional protection for U.S. persons that did not exist prior to the FAA".

== Legislative history ==
- June 20, 2008: Passed the U.S. House of Representatives, by a 293 to 129 vote.
- June 26, 2008: A Senate vote was delayed by a filibuster spearheaded by Senators Russ Feingold and Chris Dodd. Feingold said the bill threatened civil liberties in the United States; Dodd has said granting retroactive immunity would undermine the rule of law.
- July 9, 2008: Dodd's amendment calling for a striking of Title II (the immunity provisions) was rejected 66 to 32. The bill itself was then put to a vote and passed 69 to 28.
- July 10, 2008: President George W. Bush signed the bill into law.
- September 12, 2012: The House of Representatives voted, 301 to 118, to extend the FISA Amendments Act for five years, after the act was to expire at the end of 2012.
- December 28, 2012: By a vote of 73 to 23, the U.S. Senate voted to extend the FISA Amendments Act for five years until December 31, 2017
- December 30, 2012: President Barack Obama signed the bill into law.
- January 18, 2018: The Senate approved a six-year extension of Section 702 of the Foreign Intelligence Surveillance Act.
- January 19, 2018: President Donald Trump signed S. 139, FISA Amendments Reauthorization Act of 2017, into law.
- April 20, 2024: President Joe Biden signed H.R. 7888 which reauthorizes Section 702 for 2 years.
- June 12, 2026: Section 702 expired without being reauthorized, but its surveillance authority continues until March 17, 2027.

=== Netroots opposition to the bill ===
A group of netroots bloggers and Representative Ron Paul supporters joined together to form a bipartisan political action committee called Accountability Now to raise money during a one-day money bomb, which, according to The Wall Street Journal, would be used to fund advertisements against Democratic and Republican lawmakers who supported the retroactive immunity of the telecommunications company.

== Provisions ==
Specifically, the Act:

- Prohibits the individual states from investigating, sanctioning of, or requiring disclosure by complicit telecoms or other persons.
- Permits the government not to keep records of searches, and destroy existing records (it requires them to keep the records for a period of 10 years).
- Grants telecommunications companies immunity for cooperation with authorities –
  - "Release from liability.—No cause of action shall lie in any court against any electronic communication service provider for providing any information, facilities, or assistance in accordance with [an order/request/directive issued by the Attorney General or the Director of National Intelligence]"
- Removes requirements for detailed descriptions of the nature of information or property targeted by the surveillance if the target is reasonably believed to be outside the country.
- Increased the time for warrantless surveillance from 48 hours to 7 days, if the FISA court is notified and receives an application, specific officials sign the emergency notification, and relates to an American located outside of the United States with probable cause they are an agent of a foreign power. After 7 days, if the court denies or does not review the application, the information obtained cannot be offered as evidence. If the United States Attorney General believes the information shows threat of death or bodily harm, they can try to offer the information as evidence in future proceedings.
- Permits the Director of National Intelligence and the Attorney General to jointly authorize warrantless electronic surveillance, for one-year periods, targeted at a foreigner who is abroad. This provision was set to sunset on December 31, 2012; however, on December 30, 2012, President Obama signed a bill to extend this provision until December 31, 2017.
- Requires FISA court permission to target wiretaps at Americans who are overseas.
- Requires government agencies to cease warranted surveillance of a targeted American who is abroad if said person enters the United States. (However, said surveillance may resume if it is reasonably believed that the person has left the States.)
- Prohibits targeting a foreigner to eavesdrop on an American's calls or e-mails without court approval.
- Allows the FISA court 30 days to review existing but expiring surveillance orders before renewing them.
- Allows eavesdropping in emergencies without court approval, provided the government files required papers within a week.
- Prohibits the government from invoking war powers or other authorities to supersede surveillance rules in the future.
- Requires the Inspectors General of all intelligence agencies involved in the President's Surveillance Program to "complete a comprehensive review" and report within one year

== Effects ==
- The provisions of the Act granting immunity to the complicit telecoms companies create a roadblock for a number of lawsuits intended to expose and thwart the alleged abuses of power and illegal activities of the federal government since and before the September 11 attacks.
- Allows the government to conduct surveillance of "a U.S. person located outside of the U.S. with probable cause they are an agent of a foreign power" for up to one week (168 hours) without a warrant, increased from the previous 48 hours, as long as the FISA court is notified at the time such surveillance begins, and an application as usually required for surveillance authorization is submitted by the government to FISA within those 168 hours

== ACLU lawsuit ==
The American Civil Liberties Union (ACLU) filed a lawsuit challenging the FISA Amendments Act of 2008 on the day it was enacted. The case was filed on behalf of a broad coalition of attorneys and human rights, labor, legal, and media organizations whose ability to perform their work—which relies on confidential communications—could be compromised by the new law. The complaint, captioned Amnesty et al. v McConnell and filed in the United States District Court for the Southern District of New York, argued that the eavesdropping law violated people's rights to free speech and privacy under the First and Fourth Amendments to the Constitution. The case was dismissed from the district court on the grounds that the plaintiffs could not prove their claims, but was revived in March 2011 by the United States Court of Appeals for the Second Circuit, which disagreed. The subsequent citation was Amnesty v. Blair.

== Comparisons ==
In an internet broadcast interview with Timothy Ferriss, Daniel Ellsberg compared the current incarnation of FISA to the East German Stasi. Ellsberg stated that the powers which were currently being given to the federal government through this and other recent amendments to FISA since the September 11 attacks opened the door to abuses of power and unwarranted surveillance.

== See also ==
- NSA warrantless surveillance (2001–07)
- Defense of Democracies
- Protect America Act of 2007
