= Internet Protocol Detail Record =

Telecommunications protocol detail record

In telecommunications, an IP Detail Record (IPDR) provides information about Internet Protocol (IP)-based service usage and other activities that can be used by operations support systems (OSSes) and business support systems (BSSes). The content of the IPDR is determined by the service provider, network/service element vendor, or any other community of users with authority for specifying the particulars of IP-based services in a given context. The IPDR specifications were originally produced by the Internet Protocol Detail Record Organization, Inc. (aka IPDR.org). In 2007, the IPDR.org organization was acquired by the TM Forum, an industry association of more than 900 global members in over 160 countries from across the converging industries of telecom, cable, media and the Internet. The IPDR specifications include requirements for IPDR collection, encoding and transport protocols to exchange IPDR records, the IPDR service specification design guidance, and several sample IPDR Service Definition documents. The IPDR specs are maintained and continue to evolve at the TM Forum Interface Program. The president and COO of IPDR was Kelly Anderson, and the technical team lead of IPDR from 2004 until it was Amit Kleinmann of Amdocs.

== Formation and history ==
During the summer of 1999, while the communications industry was grappling with massive growth in the use of Internet Protocol-based networks for voice and data communications, a group of industry veterans formed the IPDR Organization to begin to establish standards for use in operational and business support systems used by the communications carriers. Originally formed as an informal confederation of about 60 industry experts from 20 companies, including Narus, Sun Microsystems, Hewlett-Packard, AT&T and others who were active in the industry, the organization quickly matured into a formal structure, tackling a range of technical issues associated with the deployment of systems to support the growth of IP-based communications services.

By 2002, the group was involving industry-specific software development companies to perform interoperability testing and encompassed working forums around five distinct tracks of industry challenges, had hired a staff, and appointed Aron Heintz as President to guide the quickly growing body of technical work being conducted within the largely volunteer organization.

IPDR had also established a formal board of directors structure, enlisting a range of industry experts from industry players in the United States and Canada to oversee the development of the standards and protocols being developed by the group, including Martin Demers (replaced in 2003 by Stefan Mihai) of Ace*comm, Kelly Anderson of Intrado, Mark Farmer of Amdocs, Tal Givoly of Xacct Technologies, Matthew Lucas of Telestrategies, Jeff Meyer of Hewlett-Packard, Kevin McCoy of Cisco Systems, Mike Norris of Telus, Steve O'Neal of Sprint PCS and Pankaj Patel of Convergys.

== IPDR in the cable market ==
CableLabs has included IPDR as part of the DOCSIS OSS definitions. It was first included in an ECN to the DOCSIS 1.1 operations support system interface in 2004. CableLabs has also included IPDR/SP as part of its OCAP 1.1 in 2007. IPDR has continued to be extended into DOCSIS, with major extensions in DOCSIS 3.0 and EuroDOCSIS 3.0.

== IPDR in the broadband market ==
As a result of a formal liaison established between the TM Forum and the Broadband Forum, IPDR technology was incorporated into the TR-069 family of specifications as the Bulk Data Collection technology and published in May, 2012 as TR-232.
