= Antony Duff =

British diplomat and Director General of MI5 (1920–2000)

The Right Honourable Sir Antony Duff GCMG CVO DSO DSC
- Born: Arthur Antony Duff; 25 February 1920; Moreton, Dorset, England
- Died: 13 August 2000 (aged 80); Yeovil, Somerset, England
- Education: Britannia Royal Naval College
- Occupations: Intelligence officer; diplomat
- Spouse: Pauline Sword (m. 1944)
- Awards: Privy Councillor; Knight Grand Cross of the Order of St Michael and St George; Commander of the Royal Victorian Order; Distinguished Service Order; Distinguished Service Cross; Mentioned in Despatches
- Espionage activity
- Allegiance: United Kingdom
- Service branch: MI5
- Service years: 1985–1988
- Rank: Director General of MI5
- Military career
- Branch: Royal Navy
- Commands: HMS Otway; HMS L23; HMS Stubborn

Sir Arthur Antony Duff GCMG CVO DSO DSC PC (25 February 1920 – 13 August 2000) was a senior British diplomat and Director General of MI5.

== Early life and naval service ==
Duff was born on 25 February 1920, to Admiral Sir Arthur Allen Morison Duff KCB and Margaret Grace Dawson, at Var Trees House, Moreton, Dorset. Educated at the Royal Naval College, Dartmouth, Duff started his career in the Royal Navy where he was a submarine commander during the Second World War; he briefly commanded HMS Otway and HMS L23 in 1942 before commanding HMS Stubborn from December 1942 to July 1944. He was mentioned in despatches in 1941, awarded the Distinguished Service Cross in 1943.

== Diplomatic career ==
After the war Duff joined the Diplomatic Service in January 1946. He was Counsellor and Head of the Chancery of the United Kingdom Embassy in West Germany from 1962 to 1964, the British Ambassador to Nepal from 1964 to 1965; the Head of the South Asia Department of the Foreign Office from 1965 to 1969; the Deputy High Commissioner to Malaysia from 1969 to 1972; and the British High Commissioner to Kenya from 1972 to 1975.

Duff was the Deputy Under Secretary for Middle East and Africa from 1975 to 1977; and the Deputy Under Secretary for Defence and Intelligence from 1977 to 1990, including serving concurrently as the Senior Deputy Under Secretary from 1976 to 1979. Having led the British official delegation to the Lancaster House talks, he became Deputy Governor of Southern Rhodesia under Lord Soames from 1979 to 1980.

== Cabinet Office and MI5 ==
Duff was sworn of the Privy Council in the 1980 Birthday Honours, the first diplomat to be so honoured since Sir Alexander Cadogan in 1940. Duff was Deputy Secretary (Intelligence and Security Co-ordinator) at the Cabinet Office with responsibility for security matters from 1980 to 1984. He was then Director General of the Security Service (MI5) from 1985 to 1988.

== Later life ==
After his retirement in January 1988, Duff worked as a volunteer in a centre for the homeless and was a board member of Homeless Network in London.

== Personal life and death ==
In 1944, Duff married Pauline Sword (née Bevan), a widow who had a child from her first marriage. The couple would go on to have three children together.

Duff died from bronchopneumonia at Yeovil District Hospital on 13 August 2000.

== Honours ==
Duff was appointed a Companion of the Order of St Michael and St George (CMG) in the 1964 Birthday Honours, promoted to Knight Commander of the Order (KCMG) in the 1973 Birthday Honours. and to Knight Grand Cross of the Order (GCMG) in the 1980 New Year Honours.

He was appointed a Commander of the Royal Victorian Order (CVO) in 1972.

Diplomatic posts
Preceded by Guy Clarke	Ambassador to Nepal; 1964–1965	Succeeded by Arthur Kellas
Preceded by Sir Eric Norris	High Commissioner to Kenya; 1972–1975	Succeeded by Sir Stanley Fingland
Government offices
Preceded by Sir John Jones	Director General of MI5; 1985–1988	Succeeded by Sir Patrick Walker
