= H. K. Lewis & Co. Ltd. =

British book publisher and bookseller, 1844–1989

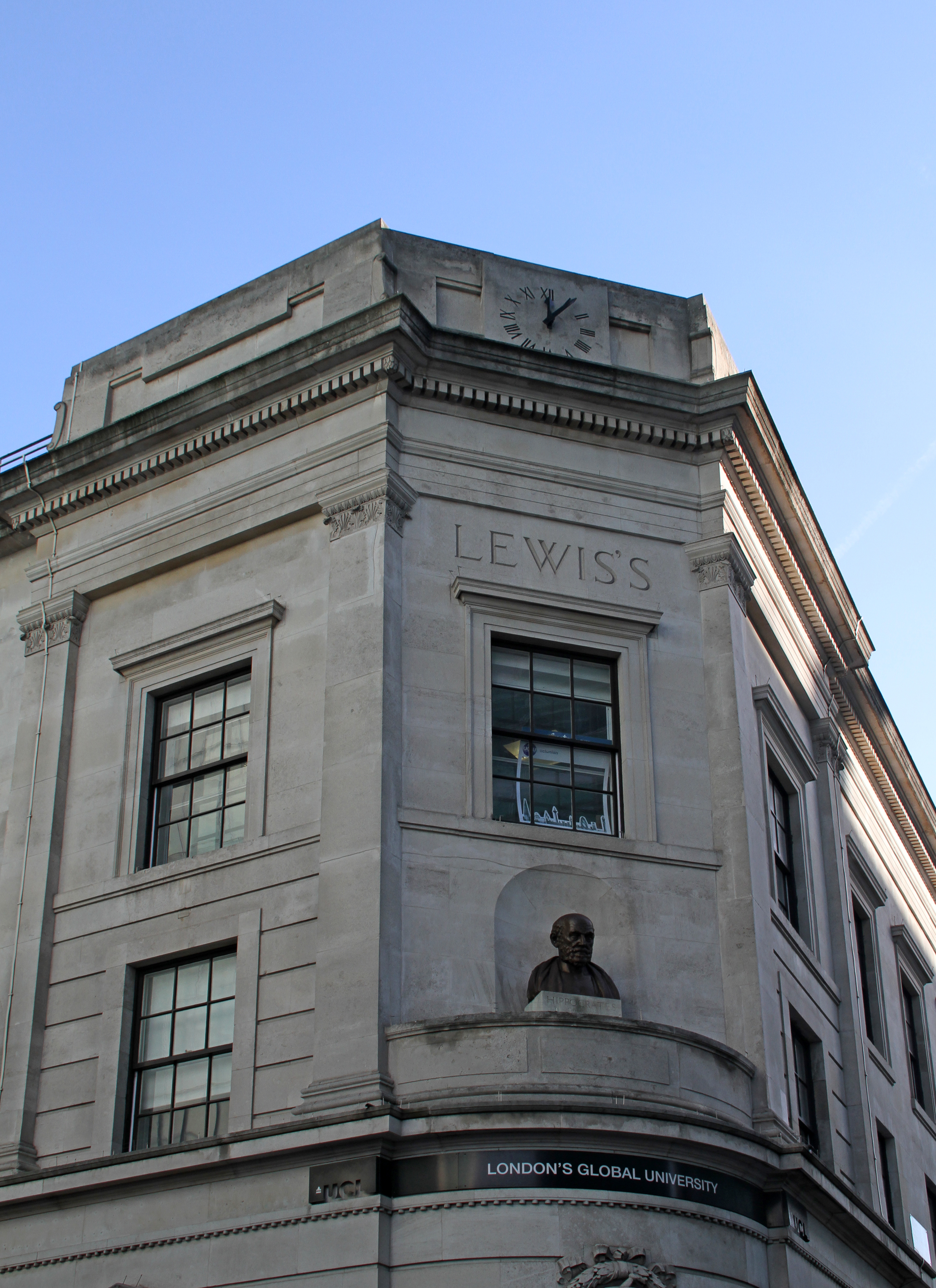
- Lewis Building; 136 Gower Street, London
- Founded: 1844
- Founder: Henry King Lewis
- Defunct: 1989
- Country of origin: United Kingdom
- Headquarters location: London
- Nonfiction topics: Medicine; Science

H. K. Lewis & Co. Ltd. (also known as Lewis's) was a prominent publisher, bookseller, and lender of books and journals, based in London. The company played a significant role in the field of medical and scientific publishing throughout the late 19th and 20th centuries. It occupied several premises in Gower Street and Gower Place in Bloomsbury, close to University College London (UCL), until it was acquired and dissolved by Pentos in 1989.

== History, activities and reputation ==
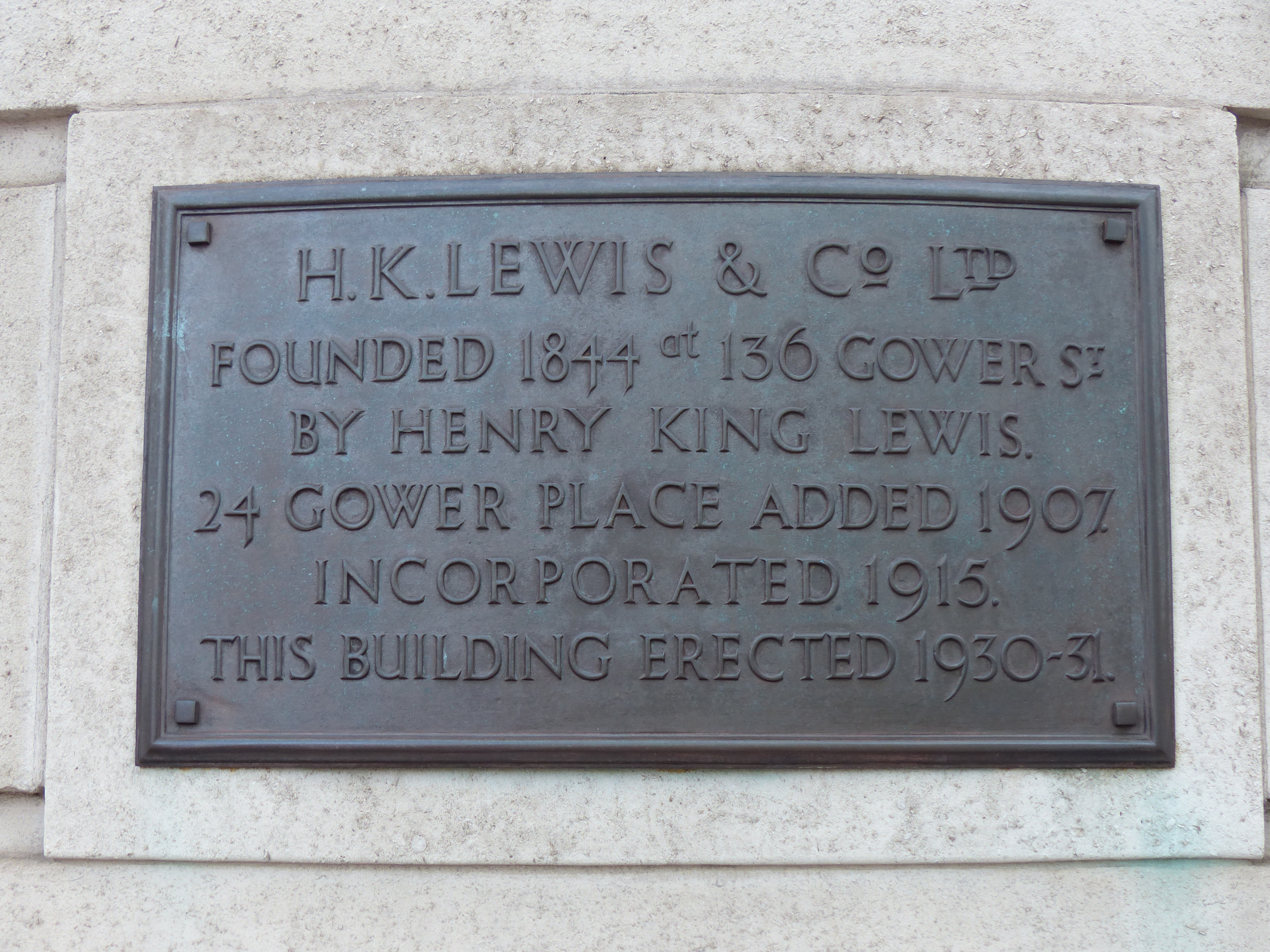
Henry King Lewis plaque at 136 Gower Street

H. K. Lewis & Co. Ltd. was founded in 1844 by Henry King Lewis (born 10 February 1823 in Margate, died 30 January 1898 in Hastings) at 15 Gower Street as a small bookselling and stationery business. In the 1871 census he had expanded his business and become a publisher. The firm was incorporated in 1915.

Initially, the company focused on publishing medical and scientific books, catering to the growing demand for professional literature in those fields. H. K. Lewis gained a reputation for producing high-quality publications that were widely recognised by medical professionals and scholars. Over the years, the company expanded its publishing to encompass a wide range of medical and scientific disciplines, including anatomy, physiology, surgery, pharmacology, and more. It actively collaborated with leading experts and authors, publishing their works and contributing to advances in medical knowledge and research. H. K. Lewis's publications were known for their accuracy, comprehensiveness, innovative content, and their high standard of book production. The company played an important role in the dissemination of medical knowledge and education, contributing significantly to the development of the medical and scientific communities, and was an influential publisher for several decades.

In addition to publishing, H. K. Lewis operated as a prominent bookseller. The company maintained a well-stocked bookstore, Lewis's, in London, serving as a valuable resource for medical professionals, researchers, and students seeking the latest publications in their respective fields.

The company was also known for the quality of its medical and scientific circulating library, Lewis's Medical, Scientific And Technical Lending Library, lending books and journals to its subscribers. Dr. Om P. Sharma, a professor of medicine in Los Angeles recalled the library in the British Medical Journal on 8 January 2000:

"Just a few blocks away at 136 Gower Street stood H.K. Lewis & Co. Ltd, booksellers. Founded by Henry King Lewis in 1844, it was also a lending library. The membership dues were minimal. Members could borrow books, regardless of price. It was the best bargain for those of us who had come from overseas with limited funds."

Readers of The Lancet medical journal, for example, who did not wish to keep a copy paid slightly more than half The Lancet's subscription and after reading it gave it to Lewis's, who displayed an advertisement, "Second Reading of the Lancet to Let", to attract second readers who paid the balance of the subscription.

In 1945 the company published a red cloth-covered book with a gilt title and crest, titled "Lewis's 1844–1944: A Brief Account of a Century's Work", with numerous black and white illustrations.

In 1989 the company was acquired by the Pentos publishing group, which dissolved in 1997 and was acquired by Waterstones.

== Locations ==
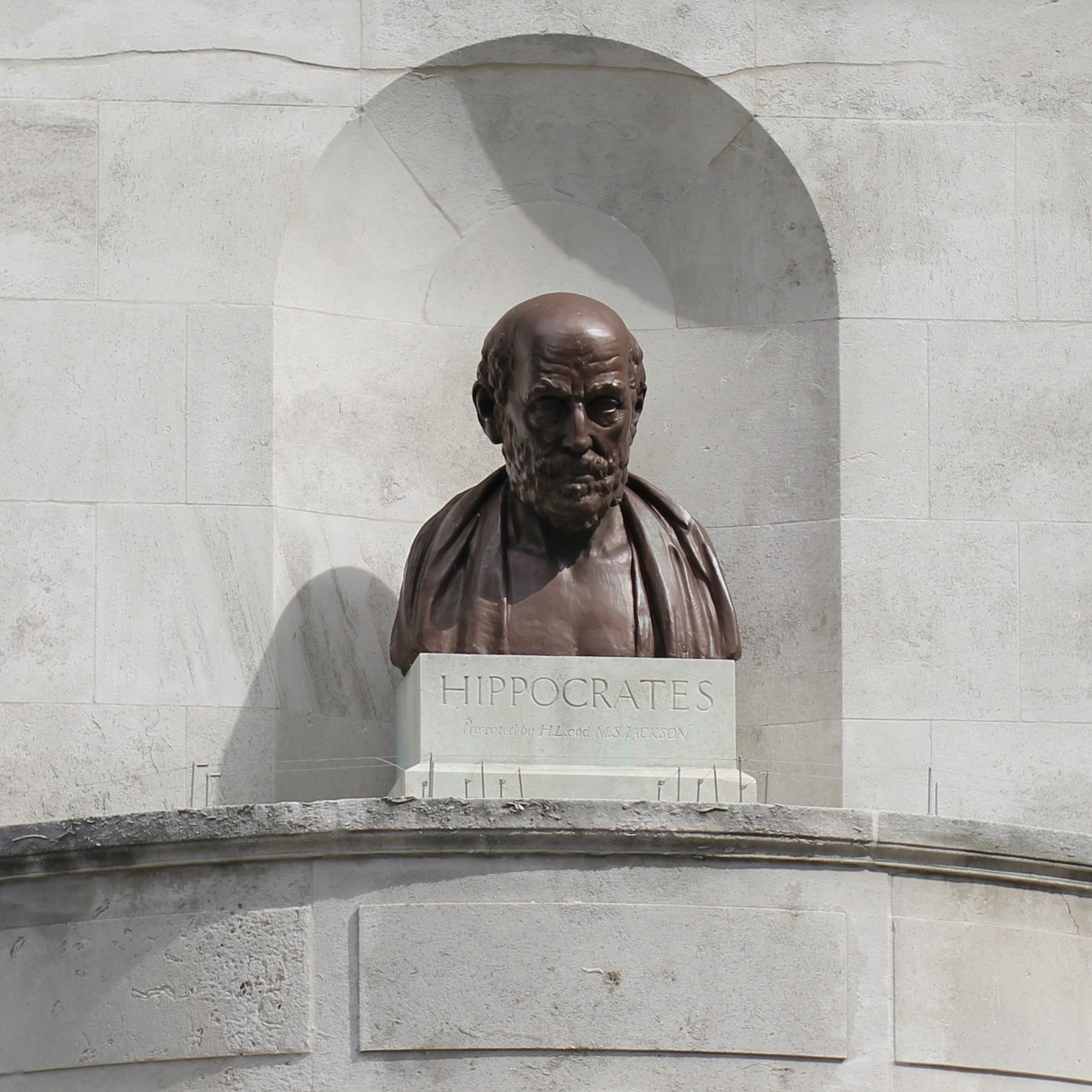
Bust of Hippocrates at 136 Gower Street, inscribed "Presented by H.L. and M.S. Jackson"

136 Gower Street was the best-known location, and housed sales and the reading library. The current Lewis Building was erected in 1930–31. The name "Lewis's" is carved at the top of the building, beneath a clock. It also displays a bronze bust of Hippocrates the "Father of Medicine" by William Aumonier Jr., based on a sculpture held at the British Museum, and presented by the chairman H.L. Jackson and his wife. The building is now part of University College London.

140 Gower Street was used in the first half of the 20th century for Lewis's second hand book department. The site was sold in 1950, redeveloped and subsequently occupied by several government offices, including the Security Service (MI5).

24 Gower Place was added in 1907.

28 Gower Place housed the publishing department.

== Collections ==
In 1989 the archives of H.K. Lewis were deposited at University College London. The collection contains administrative information, correspondence, printed items, and photographs.
