= Eliza Manningham-Buller =

Former Director General of MI5 (born 1948)

The Right Honourable The Baroness Manningham-Buller LG DCB
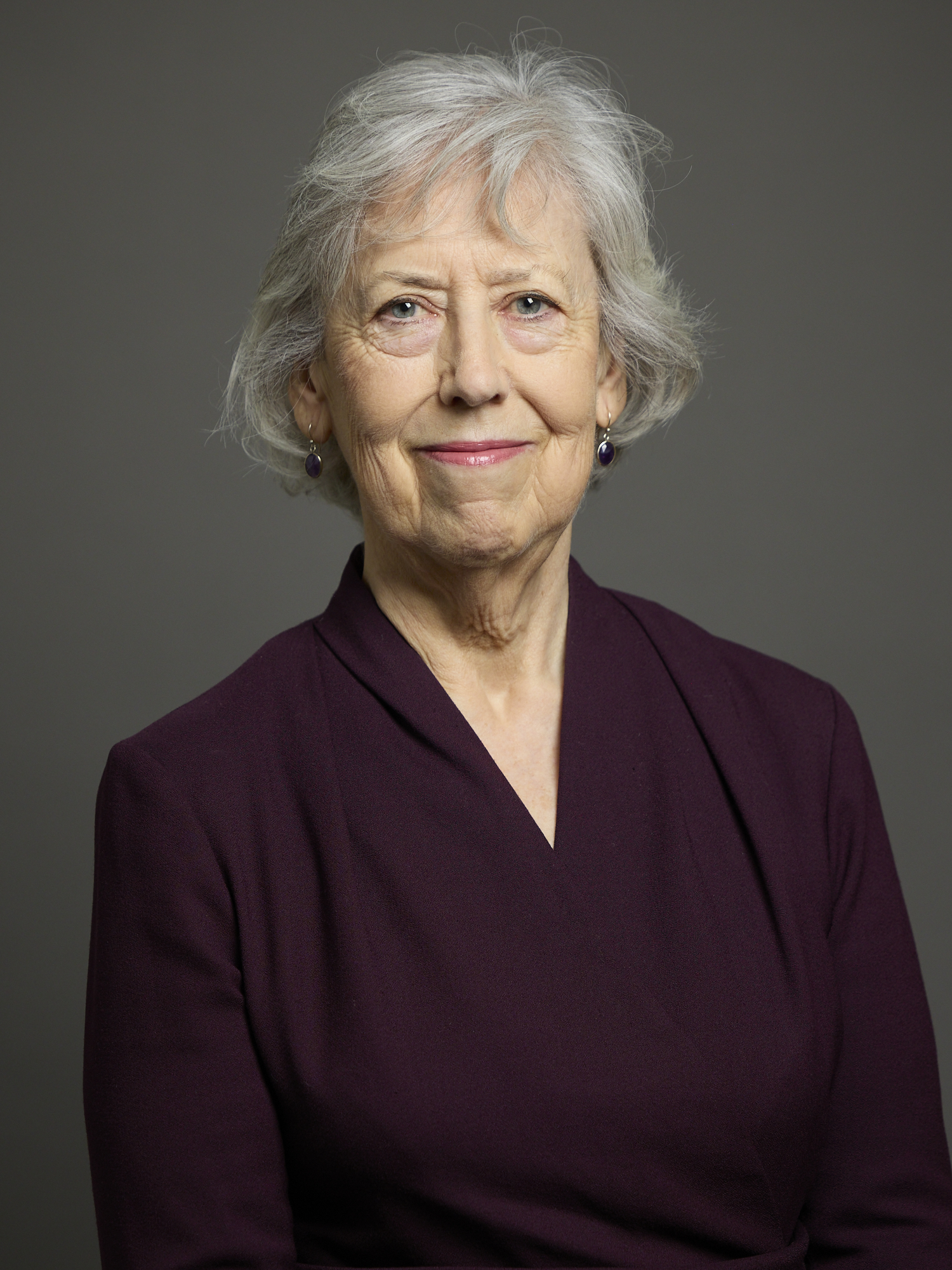
- Official portrait, 2025

Chancellor of the Order of the Garter
- Incumbent
- Assumed office 18 June 2024
- Monarch: Charles III
- Preceded by: The Duke of Abercorn

Director-General of MI5
- In office 7 October 2002 – 8 April 2007
- Home Secretary: David Blunkett; Charles Clarke; John Reid
- Preceded by: Stephen Lander
- Succeeded by: Jonathan Evans

Member of the House of Lords
- Lord Temporal
- Life peerage 2 June 2008

Personal details
- Born: Elizabeth Lydia Manningham-Buller; 14 July 1948 (age 78) Northampton, England
- Parent(s): Reginald Manningham-Buller, 1st Viscount Dilhorne; Lady Mary Lindsay
- Relatives: The 2nd Viscount Dilhorne (brother); The Baroness Nicholson of Winterbourne (first cousin)
- Education: Northampton High School; Benenden School; Lady Margaret Hall, Oxford
- Occupation: Peer
- Profession: Intelligence Officer

Military service
- Allegiance: United Kingdom
- Branch/service: MI5
- Years of service: 1974–2007
- Rank: Director General of MI5
- Battles/wars: Investigation of Lockerbie bombing
- Awards: Lady Companion of the Order of the Garter; Dame Commander of the Order of the Bath
- Eliza Manningham-Buller's voice Recorded September 2011 from the BBC Radio 4 programme the Reith Lectures

Elizabeth Lydia Manningham-Buller, Baroness Manningham-Buller (born 14 July 1948) is a retired British intelligence officer. She worked as a teacher for three years before joining MI5, the British internal Security Service. She led the newly created Irish counter-terrorism section from 1992 and then became director in charge of surveillance and technical operations. She became Director General of MI5 in October 2002 and, in that capacity, led the Security Service's response to the 7 July 2005 London bombings. Following her retirement in April 2007, she became a crossbench life peer in 2008.

She became chair of the Conduct Committee, which is a select committee of the House of Lords, on 19 January 2022. As of 2020, she is listed as #86 in Forbes list of the World's 100 Most Powerful Women. She was appointed Chancellor of the Order of the Garter by King Charles III in June 2024.

== Professional life ==
Manningham-Buller worked as a teacher for three years at Queen's Gate School, Kensington, London from 1971 to 1974, having read English at Lady Margaret Hall, Oxford, before joining the Security Service. She was recruited to the Security Service at a drinks party when someone suggested that she see someone at the Ministry of Defence. Specializing in counter-terrorism rather than MI5's then-classical counter-espionage, she was active at the time of the Lockerbie bombing by Libya in 1988. During the early 1980s, she was reportedly one of only five people aware that Oleg Gordievsky, the deputy head of the KGB rezidentura at the Soviet embassy in London, was a double agent. She was one of the few people who knew that it was Gordievsky who had exposed Michael Bettaney.

She was a senior liaison officer working out of Washington, D.C. to the US intelligence community over the period of the first Gulf War, before leading the newly created Irish counter-terrorism section from 1992 when MI5 were given the lead responsibility for such work (from the Metropolitan Police). Having been promoted to the management board of the Security Service the next year, Manningham-Buller became the director in charge of surveillance and technical operations. She was appointed Deputy Director General in 1997, and succeeded Sir Stephen Lander as Director General in 2002, the second woman to take on the role after Dame Stella Rimington.

In the 2005 Birthday Honours, Manningham-Buller was appointed a Dame Commander of the Order of the Bath (DCB). She resigned from MI5 on 21 April 2007, and was succeeded by her deputy, Jonathan Evans. She was raised to the peerage as Baroness Manningham-Buller, of Northampton in the County of Northamptonshire on 2 June 2008.

She reportedly joined the public speaking circuit. She was appointed to the Court and Council of Imperial College London in 2009, becoming deputy chairman later that year, and named chairman in July 2011. She became a governor of biomedical research charity the Wellcome Trust in 2008 and the first female chair of the Trust on 1 October 2015. She left the Wellcome Trust in 2021, being replaced as chair by Julia Gillard on 12 April 2021. From 2015 to 2025, she was co-president of Chatham House.

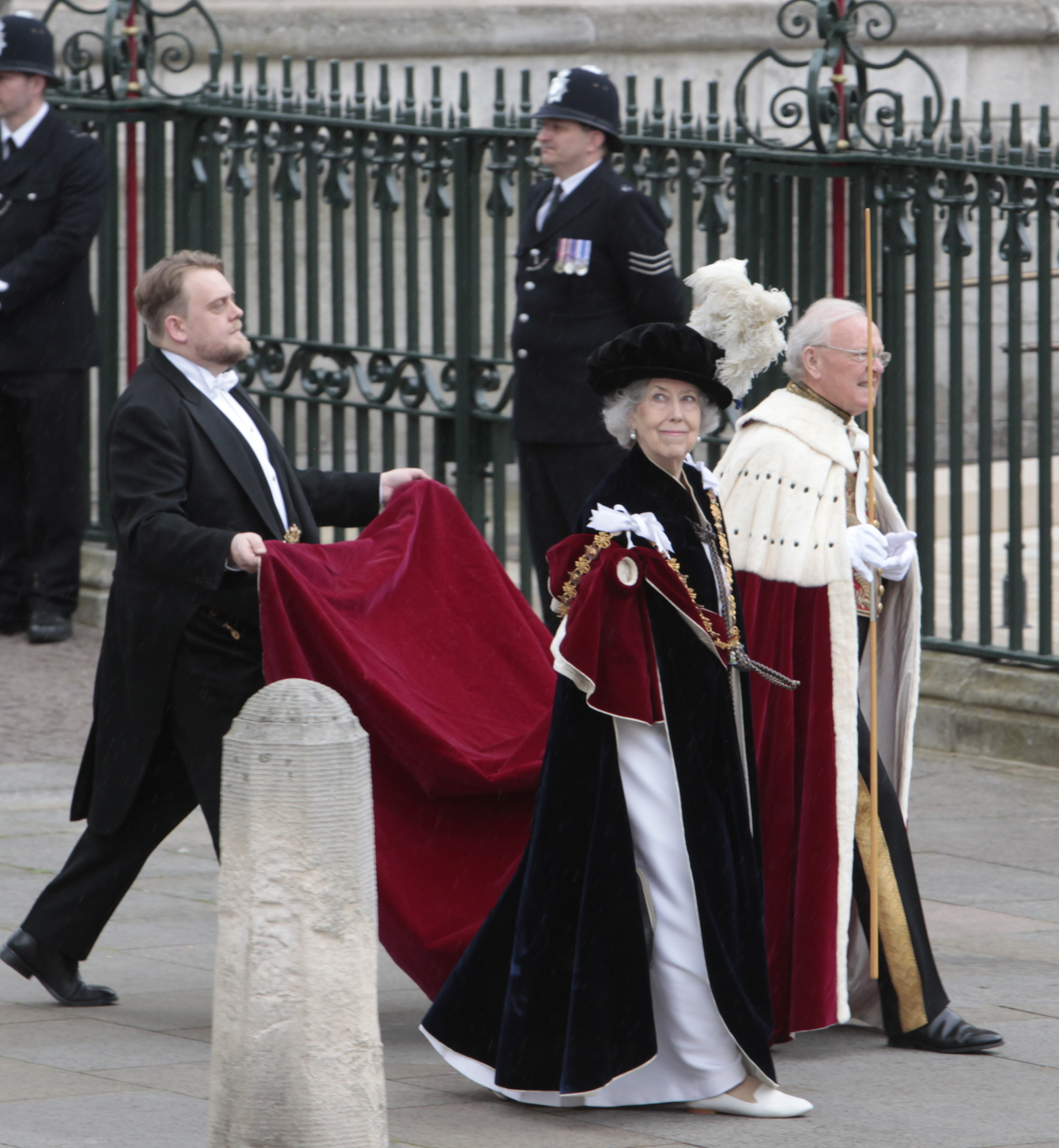
Manningham-Buller in the robes of a Lady Companion of the Garter during the Coronation of King Charles III in 2023

On St George's Day (23 April) 2014, Manningham-Buller was appointed a Lady Companion of the Order of the Garter (LG) by Queen Elizabeth II.

She became chair of the Conduct Committee on 19 January 2022. She took part in the Royal Procession at the Coronation of Charles III and Camilla, carrying St Edward's Staff.

== Honours ==
Manningham-Buller has received honorary degrees from:

- Cranfield University (2004)
- University of St Andrews – Doctor of Laws (2010)
- Open University – Doctor of the University (2005)
- University of Oxford – Doctor of Letters, honoris causa (2012)
- University of Leeds – Honorary Doctorate of Laws (2012)
- University of Buckingham – Doctor of Letters (2016)
- University of Dundee – Doctor of Laws (2017)
- University of London – Doctor of Laws, honoris causa (2019)

She has also been awarded honorary fellowships by:

- Lady Margaret Hall, Oxford (2004)
- University of Northampton (2008)
- Cardiff University (2010)
- Academy of Medical Sciences (2017)
- The Royal Society (2025)
- City and Guilds of London Institute

== Personal life ==
Manningham-Buller was the second daughter in a family of four, born to Reginald Manningham-Buller, 1st Viscount Dilhorne, and his wife, the former Lady Mary Lindsay. Manningham-Buller's father, Lord Dilhorne (1905–1980), was a Conservative MP from 1943 to 1962. He was Britain's second highest legal officer, the Solicitor General, and then became Britain's highest legal officer, the Attorney General. He later held the office of Lord Chancellor for two years. He was created an hereditary peer with the title Viscount Dilhorne. Her mother, Lady Dilhorne, trained carrier pigeons that were used to fly coded messages in World War II. The pigeons were dropped in wicker baskets with little parachutes over France and Germany and they were used to fly back to her mother's pigeon loft carrying intelligence. One of the pigeons won the Dickin Medal, and one brought back intelligence of the V-2 rocket project in Peenemünde, Germany. Lady Dilhorne died in Oxfordshire on 25 March 2004, aged 93.

Manningham-Buller was educated at Northampton High School and Benenden School.

On 15 July 1991, she married David John Mallock and has five stepchildren by her husband's prior marriage. Her husband died in 2021.

== Public statements ==
=== Backing the war on terror ===
Manningham-Buller has made speeches to invited audiences containing members of the press, as well as making court statements. On 17 June 2003, at a conference at the Royal United Services Institute she gave her backing to increasing the resources devoted to countering the threat from international terrorism and said that renegade scientists had given terror groups information needed to create chemical, biological, radiological and nuclear weapons. She also warned that the threat from international terrorism would be "with us for a good long time", which was why new legislation had been introduced.

=== Meeting with Labour Party MPs on 6 July 2005 ===
On the morning of 6 July 2005, fewer than 24 hours before the 7/7 bombings, Manningham-Buller assured Labour Party MPs that there was "no imminent terrorist threat to London or the rest of the country".

=== Speech on 7 July 2005 London bombings ===
On 10 September 2005, she spoke to an audience in the Netherlands about the 7 July 2005 London bombings and her disappointment that MI5 failed to stop attacks. She added: "[the] world has changed and there needs to be a debate on whether some erosion of [the] civil liberties we all value may be necessary to improve the chances of our citizens not being blown apart as they go about their daily lives".

=== Stance on gaining intelligence through torture ===
On 21 October 2005, BBC News reported Manningham-Buller's leaked court statement to the Law Lords regarding methods for collecting intelligence from overseas. This was part of an investigation by the Law Lords on whether Her Majesty's Government should have to be made aware whether the intelligence it is using was obtained through torture. "Experience proves that detainee reporting can be accurate and may enable lives to be saved", she stated, also maintaining that obtaining information from foreign intelligence agencies, which initially enters the British intelligence system via MI6, was vital in fighting terrorism. Regarding the ethics of how and where this intelligence is gathered she stated that "agencies will not often know the location or details of detention".

Her example to support the need for intelligence gathering from overseas was the case of Mohammed Megeurba, an Algerian man who was questioned by agencies in his country. Evidence collected by this questioning led to a raid in London which led to the Wood Green ricin plot being uncovered. Press have speculated that Megeurba was tortured to obtain this information, although Manningham-Buller has maintained neither she nor MI5 were aware of the "precise circumstances that attended their [Algerian agencies'] questioning of Megeurba". She emphasised that, had MI5 requested information regarding how the intelligence had been gathered, its request would have been ignored and the relationship between Britain and Algeria could have been damaged. She concluded by exemplifying the "importance of co-operation between states in countering the threat from international terrorism". Shami Chakrabarti, director of human rights organisation Liberty, commended Manningham-Buller for being "brutally honest" about the activities of intelligence agencies. She also stated that Britain should not "legitimise" torture as a means of intelligence gathering by accepting evidence gained in such a manner as evidence in court. Manningham-Buller stated that the British intelligence services do not ask how intelligence is obtained "because that would make things difficult".

=== Refusal to appear before the Joint Committee on Human Rights ===
On 23 January 2006, she refused to appear before the Joint Committee on Human Rights in Parliament to speak about "the extent to which the Service is, or could take steps to ensure it is, aware that information it receives from foreign agencies may have been obtained by the use of torture", and "any information which the Service may have about extraordinary renditions using UK airports".

=== Speech on MI5 after the September 11 attacks ===
On 9 November 2006, Manningham-Buller gave a speech to the Mile End Group at Queen Mary, University of London as a guest of Professor Peter Hennessy in which she warned that her office was tracking 30 terror plots, and 200 groupings or networks, totalling more than 1,600 individuals. She stated that MI5 had expanded by 50% since the September 11 attacks and stood at roughly 2,800 staff. She reiterated her warning that the threat "may – I suggest will – include the use of chemicals, bacteriological agents, radioactive materials and even nuclear technology".

This speech came three days after Dhiren Barot was sentenced to 40 years for his part in the 2004 Financial buildings plot in which he had a plan to build a radiological dirty bomb that involved setting fire to 10,000 smoke alarms. In September 2011, Eliza Manningham-Buller delivered one of the BBC Radio Reith Lectures and answered questions from an audience that included historian Peter Hennessy and novelist Ian McEwan.

=== Criticism of 42-day terrorism detention ===
On 8 July 2008, Manningham-Buller made her maiden speech in the House of Lords following her resignation. She told the House that she was against government plans to extend the time period for retaining terrorist suspects in the UK from 28 to 42 days. She told peers that she disagreed on a "practical basis as well as a principled one". She criticised the plans for terrorism detention as being not "in any way workable" and emphasised the need for all political parties to work together in finding a solution for dealing with terrorism. Furthermore, Manningham-Buller maintained that "complete security" could never be achieved in a country and that civil liberties were at risk of being compromised if the plans were passed by the House of Lords.

The four minute speech attracted praise from other Lords, including Baroness Ramsay of Cartvale, who described it as "outstanding, thoughtful and valuable", but also significant attention in the media, given the Baroness's expertise in counter-terrorism issues. Martin Kettle, writing in The Guardian on 11 July 2008, described it as "devastatingly succinct" and "the fatal shot" which would ensure that the Government's "plans were holed below the water line". James Kirkup of The Daily Telegraph described it as "a huge blow to Gordon Brown's plans to extend the detention of terrorist suspects to 42 days".

Other peers supported Manningham-Buller's stance against the plans, including former Attorney General Lord Goldsmith, former Lord Chancellor Lord Falconer of Thoroton and former Chairperson of the Joint Intelligence Committee (JIC) Lady Neville-Jones. Nevertheless, Lord West of Spithead, who was First Sea Lord of the Royal Navy until 2006 and was then a junior Home Office minister, spoke for the Government and implied that more stringent security measures were required to deal with the "unprecedented terrorist threat" to the UK.

=== Lecture on torture in the House of Lords (9 March 2010) ===
Giving a lecture in the House of Lords, Manningham-Buller said "the government did lodge protests" to its US counterparts once the extent of torture was known. It is the first time that has been said publicly. Asked if she had known of the use of waterboarding and other techniques of pressure while she was Director General of MI5, from October 2002 until her retirement in April 2007, she said she had done, and had disapproved. "Nothing – not even the saving of lives – justifies torturing people ... the Americans were very keen to conceal from us what they were doing [with suspects]".

=== 2010 Iraq inquiry comments ===
Manningham-Buller giving evidence to the Iraq inquiry in July 2010 said the decision to go to war meant that "Our involvement in Iraq, for want of a better word, radicalised a whole generation of young people, some of them British citizens who saw our involvement in Iraq, on top of our involvement in Afghanistan, as being an attack on Islam," she said, before immediately correcting herself by adding "not a whole generation, a few among a generation". As a result, she said she was not "surprised" that UK nationals were involved in the 7 July 2005 bombings in central London. She said she believed the intelligence on Iraq's threat was not "substantial enough" to justify the action. A year after the invasion, she said MI5 was "swamped" by leads about terrorist threats to the UK.

== Desert Island Discs ==
Manningham-Buller was a castaway on Desert Island Discs broadcast on BBC Radio 4 in November 2007 giving her first interview after her retirement. She talked briefly about her personal life and her former professional life, including her reactions to the 7 July 2005 London bombings and the importance of protecting their agents. She said that she had decided on her retirement date shortly after she took up the Director General job, choosing to retire with a total of 33 years' service in the security services. She chose an anthology of poems edited by Ted Hughes and Seamus Heaney, titled The Rattle Bag.

== The BBC Reith Lectures ==
In June 2011, the BBC announced Eliza Manningham-Buller would present the 2011 Reith Lectures, alongside the Burmese pro-democracy leader Aung San Suu Kyi in a series titled "Securing Freedom". Eliza Manningham-Buller's lectures were broadcast on BBC Radio 4 and the BBC World Service in September 2011.

In her first lecture, titled "Terror", recorded at BBC Broadcasting House in London, she reflected on the lasting significance of 11 September 2001, asking was it a terrorist crime, an act of war, or something different. She also revealed details of her own role in the discussions involving international security agencies in the days following the attacks on New York and Washington DC and examined the impact the US-led invasion of Iraq had on the fight against al-Qaeda.

In her second lecture, titled "Security", recorded at the Leeds City Museum, she stated that the use of torture is "wrong and never justified" and should be "utterly rejected even when it may offer the prospect of saving lives". She said that the use of torture had not made the world a safer place, adding that the use of water-boarding by the United States was a "profound mistake" and as a result America lost its "moral authority".

In her third and final lecture, titled "Freedom", recorded at the British Library in London, she discussed foreign policy priorities since the September 11 attacks. She stated that it was "necessary" to talk to dictators and terrorists, to protect security and said that the British government's decision to engage with Colonel Gaddafi in 2003 was "the right decision". She went on to say that protecting British citizens would be impossible if the security services were restricted to talking to only those with shared values and cited examples where people once deemed terrorists were now part of the political establishment: "Look at Northern Ireland, where former terrorists are in government... look at Mandela and the ANC which used terror tactics when it was in exile." During the recording of the final lecture she revealed that she had suffered an anxiety dream, in which she imagined that she was to be arrested for breaking the Official Secrets Act after having given the lectures.

== Coat of arms ==
Coat of arms of Eliza Manningham-Buller
Coronet Coronet of a Baron Escutcheon Quarterly: 1st & 4th, Sable, on a Cross Argent, quarterly pierced of the field, four Eagles displayed of the first (Buller); 2nd & 3rd, Sable, a Fess Ermine, in chief three Griffins' Heads erased Or (Manningham) Supporters An Eagle wings elevated and addorsed Ermine beaked and legged Or gorged with a Ducal Coronet Gules therefrom a Line reflexed over the back and terminating in a knot Sable; Sinister: a Pegasus Azure winged crined unguled and queued Argent; both charged on the shoulder with a Portcullis chained Or. Motto AQUILA NON CAPIT MUSCAS Orders Order of the Garter (appointed 23 April 2014) Order of the Bath (appointed DCB 2005) Banner The banner of the Baroness Manningham-Buller's arms used as Lady Companion of the Garter depicted at St George's Chapel.

== See also ==
- List of terrorist incidents in the United Kingdom

Government offices
Preceded by Sir Stephen Lander	Director General of MI5; 2002–2007	Succeeded by Jonathan Evans
Honorary titles
Preceded by The Duke of Abercorn	Chancellor of the Order of the Garter; 2024–present	Incumbent
