= Garden Suburb =

Garden Suburb may refer to:

- Garden Suburb, New South Wales, Australia
- Garden Suburb, Oldham, England
- Garden Suburb Theatre, theatre company in London, England
- Garden Suburb (ward), electoral ward in Barnet, England
