= Sidney Henry Noakes =

Sidney Henry Noakes (6 January 1905 –February 1993) was a British lawyer.

Noakes was the second of three children born to Thomas Frederick and Ada Noakes. Noakes was raised by foster parents after the death of his parents. He was educated at Merchant Taylor's School, Hertfordshire, where he excelled academically and was accepted to study law at St John's College, Oxford in 1925. Noakes was called to the bar at Lincoln's Inn in 1928 following graduation. Noakes was part of the Security Service (MI5) during the Second World War as well as serving with the Intelligence Corps, having been commissioned in 1943. Noakes rose to the rank of lieutenant colonel in the Intelligence Corps.

Noakes had a long legal career and eventually became a Judge, serving in the County Courts circuits in Surrey, Hertfordshire and Kent in the 1960s. Noakes was elected a bencher of Lincoln's Inn in June 1963.

Noakes was briefly married, and had a daughter. Noakes spent his retirement in Hove, and died there in 1993. It is believed that Noakes was one of two MI5 officers that participated in "a gentle interrogation" given to the senior Nazi Heinrich Himmler after his arrest at a military checkpoint in the northern German village of Bremervörde in May 1945. Himmler subsequently killed himself during a medical examination by a British officer by means of a cyanide capsule that he had concealed in his mouth. Noakes was subsequently given permission to keep Himmler's braces and the forged identity document that had led to his arrest. Noakes's great niece donated them to the Military Intelligence Museum in May 2020.

Noakes was the author of the second edition of Butterworth's digest of leading cases on workmen's compensation and Six Vital Acts of 1938.
