= Leconfield House =

Coordinates: 51.50659°N 0.15008°W

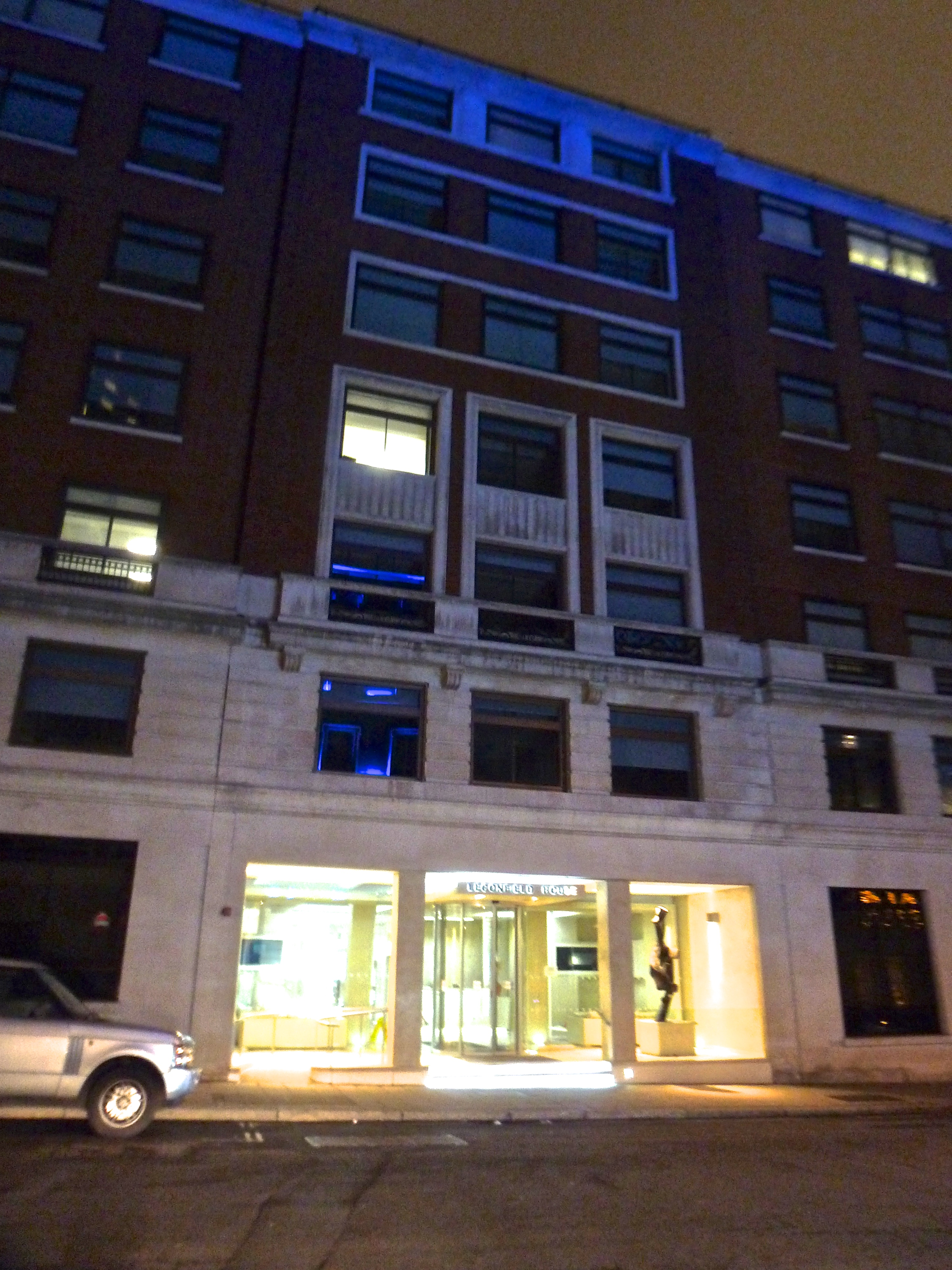
- Interactive map of the Leconfield House area

General information
- Location: Curzon Street, London
- Completed: c. 1939

Technical details
- Floor count: 7

Leconfield House is a building in Mayfair, London. It was the headquarters of the Security Service (MI5) from 1945 to 1976.

== History ==
=== Early history ===
The site at the junction of South Audley Street and Curzon Street was occupied in the second half of the 18th century, all of the 19th century and the first part of the 20th century by Chesterfield House, which was built in 1749 for Philip Stanhope, 4th Earl of Chesterfield. In 1869 Chesterfield House was purchased by the City of London merchant Charles Magniac, who considerably curtailed the grounds in the rear, and erected a row of buildings overlooking Chesterfield Street, named Chesterfield Gardens; the first occupier at No. 9 Chesterfield Gardens was Henry Wyndham, 2nd Baron Leconfield.

After Chesterfield House was demolished in 1937, part of the site was used for the construction of Leconfield House, named after Lord Leconfield, who had died in 1901. The new building, completed in 1939, served as the operational headquarters of London District throughout the Second World War.

=== Occupancy by MI5 ===
The structure went on to be occupied by the Security Service (MI5) in 1945; by 1969, when Stella Rimington arrived, it was "dreadfully run down....the inside had not been painted in an age..." The headquarters of MI5 remained at Leconfield House until 1976, when it moved to 140 Gower Street.

=== Later uses ===
The building, which has since been substantially rebuilt, is now occupied by various businesses including that of Robert and Vincent Tchenguiz. In May 2020, Robert Tchenguiz submitted plans to Westminster City Council to convert the building into a 65-bedroom private members' hotel. He had bought the building for his Rotch property business in 2004 for about £140 million. The submitted plans were refused permission by the Council, and Tchenguiz's subsequent appeal against that decision also failed. In October 2022 Tchenguiz lodged a further appeal. Meanwhile, in December 2025, former prime minister, Liz Truss, launched a campaign to recruit founder members for a new private members' club, to be called "The Leconfield", which would be accommodated within the proposed private members' hotel.
