= Martin Furnival Jones =

British intelligence officer (1912–1997)

Sir Martin Furnival Jones CBE
- Born: 7 May 1912; Chipping Barnet, England
- Died: 1 March 1997 (aged 84); Wothorpe, England
- Education: Gonville and Caius College, Cambridge
- Occupations: Intelligence officer, solicitor
- Awards: CBE (1957); Knight Bachelor (1967)
- Espionage activity
- Allegiance: United Kingdom
- Service branch: MI5
- Rank: Director General of MI5

Sir Edward Martin Furnival Jones CBE (7 May 1912 – 1 March 1997) was Director General of MI5, the United Kingdom's internal security service, from 1965 until 1972.

== Career ==
Born in High Barnet and educated at Highgate School, Furnival Jones was a Gonville and Caius College, Cambridge graduate, having read modern and medieval languages, as well as law.

He was admitted as a solicitor in England in 1937, joining the leading City of London law firm Slaughter and May. When the Second World War broke out, Furnival Jones joined the British Army. After training, he was commissioned into the Intelligence Corps on 26 October 1940 as a second lieutenant. He transferred to the MI5 in 1941. During the war, he was mentioned in despatches "in recognition of gallant and distinguished services in North West Europe", and awarded the Bronze Star Medal by the United States "in recognition of distinguished services in the cause of the Allies".

He was Director-General of MI5 from 1965 to 1972.

== Personal life ==
Jones resided in the Hampstead Garden Suburb. He was a tennis player and bird watcher and loved to perform in amateur theatre in both the local groups, including the Play and Pageant Union and Speedwell Players. It was during a production of I Remember Mama that he first met his wife, Margaret.

Government offices
Preceded by Sir Roger Hollis	Director General of MI5; 1965–1972	Succeeded by Sir Michael Hanley
