= Andrew Parker, Baron Parker of Minsmere =

British peer (born 1962)

The Right Honourable The Lord Parker of Minsmere GCVO, KCB, PC

Lord Chamberlain of the Household
- In office 1 April 2021 – 4 November 2024
- Monarchs: Elizabeth II; Charles III
- Preceded by: The Earl Peel
- Succeeded by: The Lord Benyon

Director General of MI5
- In office April 2013 – January 2020
- Home Secretary: Theresa May; Amber Rudd; Sajid Javid; Priti Patel
- Preceded by: Sir Jonathan Evans
- Succeeded by: Ken McCallum

Member of the House of Lords
- Lord Temporal
- Life peerage 29 January 2021

Personal details
- Born: Andrew David Parker; 8 May 1962 (age 64)
- Party: None (crossbench)
- Children: 2
- Education: Churchill College, Cambridge

Andrew David Parker, Baron Parker of Minsmere, GCVO, KCB, PC (born 8 May 1962) is a British life peer and former intelligence officer who served as Director General of MI5 from 2013 to 2020. He served as Lord Chamberlain of the Household from 2021 to 2024, and is a crossbench member of the House of Lords.

== Education ==
Parker was educated at Heaton Comprehensive School in Newcastle upon Tyne and then at Churchill College, Cambridge, where he studied natural sciences.

== Career ==
Parker joined the Security Service in 1983. He was seconded to HM Customs and Excise as Director Intelligence in 1999 before becoming Director, International Terrorism at the Security Service in February 2005. After leading the Security Service's response to the 7 July 2005 London bombings and the 2006 transatlantic aircraft plot, he became Deputy Director General in 2007.

Parker went on to become Director General of the Service in April 2013. As of 2015, Parker was paid a salary of between £165,000 and £169,999 by the department, making him one of the 328 most highly paid people in the British public sector at that time.

In May 2018, Parker said that Russia is seeking to undermine European democracies with "malign activities". Speaking in Berlin, Parker also condemned Russia for the "reckless" poisoning of the Skripals in Salisbury. The Kremlin was taking part in "deliberate, targeted, malign activity intended to undermine our free, open, and democratic societies". Parker also warned that Islamic State aspires to commit "devastating" and "more complex" attacks in Europe.

In 2019, Parker, writing with Cressida Dick, the Commissioner of the Metropolitan Police, suggested that far-right and far-left terrorism have been identified as key threats to the safety and prosperity of the nation. They warned that while Islamist terrorism remains the largest by scale, they are also “concerned about the growing threat from other forms of violent extremism… covering a spectrum of hate-driven ideologies, including the extreme right and left.”

In December 2020, it was announced that Parker would be created a crossbench life peer in the 2020 Special Honours. He was created Baron Parker of Minsmere, of Minsmere in the County of Suffolk, on 29 January 2021. The territorial designation reflects his interest in bird watching. He made his maiden speech on 4 March 2021, during a debate on the space industry.

Parker retired from MI5 in April 2020. On 5 February 2021, Buckingham Palace announced that Lord Parker would succeed Earl Peel as Lord Chamberlain on 1 April 2021.

The ceremonial breaking of the Lord Chamberlain's "wand of office" during the state funeral of Queen Elizabeth II on 19 September 2022 symbolised the formal end of Parker's service as Lord Chamberlain to the monarch before the late Queen was lowered into the Royal Vault for private interment that evening to join her sister, parents (George VI and Elizabeth), and husband. Parker continued to serve as Lord Chamberlain under Charles III. In this role, he took part in the 2023 coronation.

In January 2024, Parker announced his intention to step down as Lord Chamberlain by the end of the year.

On 4 November 2024, Parker returned his Wand and Insignia of Office as Lord Chamberlain and the Badge of Chancellor of the Royal Victorian Order on leaving office.

== Views ==
Parker was early to appreciate the potential impacts of AI and COVID-19.

== Personal life ==
Parker is married and has two children. He is an ornithologist and an avid wildlife photographer.

== Honours ==
Parker was appointed Knight Commander of the Order of the Bath (KCB) in the 2019 Birthday Honours. He was appointed as a Knight Grand Cross of the Royal Victorian Order upon appointment as Lord Chamberlain, and was made a member of the Privy Council a few days later.

Government offices
| Preceded by Sir Jonathan Evans | Director General of MI5; 2013–2020 | Succeeded by Ken McCallum |
Court offices
| Preceded by The Earl Peel | Lord Chamberlain; 1 April 2021 – 4 November 2024 | Succeeded by The Lord Benyon |
Orders of precedence in the United Kingdom
| Preceded by The Lord Kamall | Gentlemen; Baron Parker of Minsmere | Succeeded by The Lord Coaker |
