= 140 Gower Street =

Coordinates: 51.52543°N 0.13566°W

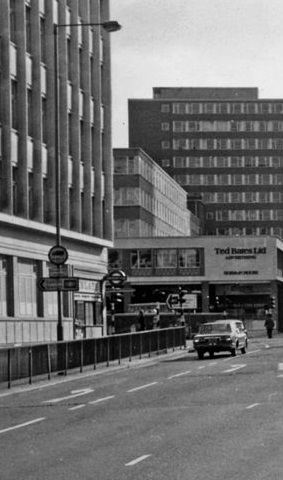
- 140 Gower Street (on the immediate left)
- Interactive map of the 140 Gower Street area

General information
- Location: Gower Street, London
- Completed: c.1950

Technical details
- Floor count: 10

140 Gower Street was the headquarters of the Security Service (MI5) from 1976 to 1994. The site was acquired by the Wellcome Trust in 1998.

== History ==
In the late 19th century the site at 140 Gower Street was occupied by a modest three-story building which was used by George J. W. Pitman, book publishers. Then in the first half of the 20th century the same building was used for the secondhand book section of H. K. Lewis & Co. Ltd., book sellers.

In 1950 the site was acquired by a property developer. After the bookshop was demolished, the site was redeveloped and a new ten-story building constructed in the early 1950s. The new building was occupied by various government offices including the Commission on Industrial Relations. The Security Service (MI5), who had relocated from Leconfield House, occupied the new building, known simply as "140 Gower Street", in 1976: the Director-General's office was on the 6th floor. MI5 moved out of the building to Thames House in 1994 and the site was acquired by the Wellcome Trust in 1998 and then redeveloped as "Babcock House".
