= MI5 =

British domestic intelligence agency

Security Service (MI5)

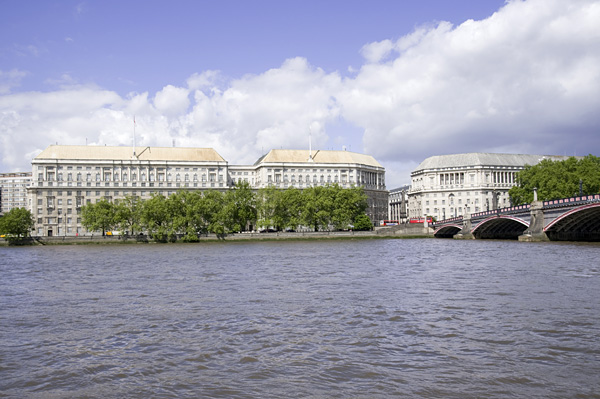
- Thames House, London

Agency overview
- Formed: 7 October 1909; 117 years ago (as the Secret Service Bureau)
- Jurisdiction: His Majesty's Government
- Headquarters: Thames House, London, United Kingdom; 51°29′38″N 0°07′32″W
- Motto: Regnum Defende (Defend the Realm)
- Employees: 5,385 (2023)
- Annual budget: Single Intelligence Account £4.932 billion (2025–26)
- Minister responsible: Shabana Mahmood, Home Secretary
- Agency executive: Ken McCallum, Director General
- Website: www.mi5.gov.uk

The Security Service, commonly known as MI5 (Military Intelligence, Section 5), is the United Kingdom's domestic counter-intelligence and security agency and is part of its intelligence machinery alongside the Secret Intelligence Service (MI6), Government Communications Headquarters (GCHQ), and Defence Intelligence (DI). MI5 is directed by the Joint Intelligence Committee (JIC), and the service is bound by the Security Service Act 1989. The service is directed to protect British parliamentary democracy and economic interests and to counter terrorism and espionage within the United Kingdom. Within the civil service community, the service is colloquially known as Box, or Box 500, after its official wartime address of PO Box 500; its current address is PO Box 3255, London SW1P 1AE.

The Security Service began as the Home Section of the Secret Service Bureau, founded in 1909. At the start of the First World War, it was responsible for the arrest of enemy spies, or suspected enemy spies. Throughout the First World War, Germany continually attempted to infiltrate Britain, but MI5 was able to identify most, if not all, of the agents dispatched. During the Second World War, it developed the Double-Cross System. This involved attempting to "turn" captured agents wherever possible, and use them to mislead enemy intelligence agencies.

After the war, the service was instrumental in breaking up a large Soviet spy ring at the start of the 1970s. It then allegedly became involved in monitoring trade unions and left-wing politicians. It also assumed responsibility for the investigation of all Irish republican activity within Britain during The Troubles. Its role was then expanded to countering other forms of terrorism, particularly in more recent years the more widespread threat of Islamic extremism and far-right politics in the United Kingdom. In 1996, legislation formalised the extension of the Security Service's statutory remit to include supporting the law enforcement agencies in their work against serious crime.

== Organisation ==
=== Structure ===
The Security Service comes under the authority of the Home Secretary within the Cabinet. The service is headed by a Director General (DG) at the grade of a Permanent Secretary of the Civil Service, who is directly supported by an internal security organisation, secretariat, legal advisory branch, and information services branch. The Deputy Director General is responsible for the operational activity of the service, being responsible for four branches; international counter-terrorism, National Security Advice Centre (counter proliferation and counter espionage), Irish and domestic counter-terrorism, and technical and surveillance operations.

The current Director General is Ken McCallum, who succeeded Andrew Parker in April 2020.

The service is directed for intelligence operational priorities by the Joint Intelligence Committee.

=== Legislation ===
Operations of the service are required to be proportionate, and compliant with British legislation, including the Regulation of Investigatory Powers Act 2000, the Investigatory Powers Act 2016, the Data Protection Act 2018, and various other items of legislation. Information held by the service is exempt from disclosure under section 23 of the Freedom of Information Act 2000. The Security Service Act of 1989 establishes several legal key mechanisms aimed at ensuring the accountability and control of the Service. Certain provisions from this act were later integrated into the Intelligence Services Act of 1994 with European Commission on Human Rights later having endorsed these mechanisms in multiple applications under the European Convention on Human Rights. Additionally, all employees of the service are bound by the Official Secrets Act 1989. They have a duty to work with the police to investigate any criminal offences under the National Security Act 2023 and the Official Secrets Act 1989.

The Security Service "is authorised to investigate any person or movement that might threaten the ... security" of the United Kingdom.

=== Oversight ===
The Service is subject to oversight and accountability through various means. These oversight mechanisms have evolved over time to meet changing governmental requirements, with the Service now being held accountable through a variety of oversight arrangements.

It is directly answerable to the Home Secretary, and is also overseen by:

- The Intelligence and Security Committee of Parliament, which is directly appointed by the Prime Minister.
- The Investigatory Powers Commissioner.
- The Investigatory Powers Tribunal.

=== Centenary and awards ===
The service marked its centenary in 2009 by publishing an official history titled The Defence of the Realm: The Authorized History of MI5, written by Christopher Andrew, Professor of Modern and Contemporary History at Cambridge University. Members of the Security Service are recognised annually by King Charles III at the Prince of Wales's Intelligence Community Awards at St James's Palace or Clarence House alongside members of the Secret Intelligence Service (MI6), and GCHQ. Awards and citations are given to teams within the agencies as well as individuals.

== History ==
=== Early years ===
The Security Service is derived from the Secret Service Bureau, founded in 1909, and concentrating originally on the activities of the Imperial German government, as a joint initiative of the Admiralty and the War Office. The Bureau was initially split into naval and army sections which, over time, specialised respectively in foreign target espionage and internal counter-espionage activities. The former specialisation was a result of a growing interest at the Admiralty, at the time, in intelligence regarding the fleet of the Imperial German Navy. This division was formalised, as separate home and foreign sections, prior to the beginning of the First World War. Following a number of administrative changes, the home section became known as Directorate of Military Intelligence, Section 5 and the abbreviation MI5, the name by which it is still known in popular culture. (The foreign/naval section of the Secret Service Bureau was to become the basis of the later Secret Intelligence Service, or MI6).

The founding head of the Army section was Vernon Kell of the South Staffordshire Regiment, who remained in that role until the early part of the Second World War. Its role was originally quite restricted, as the section existed solely to ensure national security through counter-espionage. With a small staff, and working in conjunction with the Special Branch of the Metropolitan Police, the service was responsible for overall direction and the identification of foreign agents, while Special Branch provided the manpower for the investigation of their affairs, arrest and interrogation.

=== First World War ===
On the day after the declaration of the First World War, the Home Secretary, Reginald McKenna, announced that "within the last twenty-four hours no fewer than twenty-one spies, or suspected spies, have been arrested in various places all over the country, chiefly in important military or naval centres, some of them long known to the authorities to be spies". These arrests have provoked recent historical controversy. According to the official history of MI5, the actual number of agents identified was 22, and Kell had started sending out letters to local police forces on 29 July, giving them advance warning of arrests to be made as soon as war was declared. Portsmouth Constabulary jumped the gun and arrested one on 3 August, and not all of the 22 were in custody by the time that McKenna made his speech, but the official history regards the incident as a devastating blow to Imperial Germany, which deprived them of their entire spy ring, and specifically upset the Kaiser.

However, in 2006, historian Nicholas Hiley published an article entitled "Entering the Lists" in the journal Intelligence and National Security, outlining the products of his research into recently opened files on spies arrested at the start of the First World War. Hiley was sent an advance copy of the official history, and objected to the retelling of the story. He later wrote another article, "Re-entering the Lists", which asserted that the list of those arrested published in the official history was concocted from later case histories.

In the meantime, MI5's role had grown substantially. Due to the spy hysteria, MI5 had formed with far more resources than it actually needed to track down German spies. As is common within governmental bureaucracies, this caused the service to expand its role to use its spare resources. MI5 acquired many additional responsibilities during the war. Most significantly, its strict counter-espionage role blurred considerably. It acquired a much more political role, involving the surveillance not merely of foreign agents, but also of pacifist and anti-conscription organisations, and of organised labour. This was justified by citing the common belief that foreign influence was at the root of these organisations. Thus, by the end of the First World War, MI5 was a fully-fledged investigating force (although it never had powers of arrest), in addition to being a counter-espionage agency. The expansion of this role continued after a brief post-war power struggle with the head of the Special Branch, Sir Basil Thomson.

=== Inter-war period ===
MI5 proved consistently successful throughout the rest of the 1910s and 1920s in its core counter-espionage role. In post-war years, attention turned to attempts by the Soviet Union and the Comintern to surreptitiously support revolutionary activities within Britain. MI5's expertise, combined with the early incompetence of the Soviets, meant the bureau was successful in correctly identifying and closely monitoring these activities.

After the First World War, budget-conscious politicians regarded Kell's department as unnecessary. In 1919, MI5's budget was slashed from £100,000 to just £35,000, and its establishment from over 800 officers to a mere 12. At the same time, Sir Basil Thomson of Special Branch was appointed Director of Home Intelligence, in supreme command of all domestic counter-insurgency and counter-intelligence investigations. Consequently, as official MI5 historian Christopher Andrew has noted in his official history Defence of the Realm (2010), MI5 had no clearly defined role in the Irish War of Independence of 1919–1921. To further worsen the situation, several of Kell's officers defected to Thomson's new agency, the Home Intelligence Directorate. MI5 therefore undertook no tangible intelligence operations of consequence during the conflict. MI5 did undertake the training of British Army case-officers from the Department of Military Intelligence (DMI), for the Army's so-called "Silent Section", otherwise known as M04(x).

In 1921, Sir Warren Fisher, the government inspector-general for civil-service affairs, conducted a thorough review of the operations and expenditures of Basil Thomson's Home Intelligence Directorate. He issued a scathing report, accusing Thomson of wasting both money and resources, and conducting redundant as well as ineffectual operations. Shortly thereafter, in a private meeting with Prime Minister David Lloyd George, Sir Basil Thomson was sacked, and the Home Intelligence Directorate was formally abolished. With Thomson out of the way, Special Branch was returned to the command of the Commissioner of The Criminal Investigation Division at Scotland Yard. Only then was Vernon Kell able once again to rebuild MI5 and restore it to its former place as Britain's chief domestic intelligence agency.

MI5 operated in Italy during the inter-war period, and helped Benito Mussolini get his start in politics with a £100 weekly wage.

The NKVD, meanwhile, had evolved more sophisticated methods; it began to recruit agents from within the elite universities (most notably from Cambridge University) which traditionally formed the recruitment pool for the Civil Service. Many of these recruits succeeded in gaining positions within the government, and even within the intelligence services themselves. The most famous of these spies were Kim Philby, Donald Maclean, Guy Burgess, Anthony Blunt, and John Cairncross. Undetected until after the Second World War, they became known as the Cambridge Five. All save Maclean served with MI5 or MI6 during the war, and the spy ring would pass more than 16,000 documents to the Soviets.

=== Second World War ===
One of the earliest actions of Winston Churchill on coming to power in early 1940 was to sack the agency's long-term head, Vernon Kell. He was replaced initially by the ineffective Oswald Allen Harker, as Acting Director General. Harker in turn was quickly replaced by David Petrie, a Secret Intelligence Service (SIS) man, with Harker remaining as his deputy. With the ending of the Battle of Britain, and the abandonment of invasion plans (correctly reported by both SIS and the Bletchley Park Ultra project), the spy scare eased, and the internment policy was gradually reversed. This eased pressure on MI5, and allowed it to concentrate on its major wartime success, the so-called 'double-cross' system. This was a system based on an internal memo drafted by an MI5 officer in 1936, which criticised the long-standing policy of arresting and sending to trial all enemy agents discovered by MI5. Several had offered to defect to Britain when captured; before 1939, such requests were invariably turned down. The memo advocated attempting to 'turn' captured agents wherever possible, and use them to mislead enemy intelligence agencies. This suggestion was turned into a massive and well-tuned system of deception during the Second World War.

Beginning with the capture of an agent named Arthur Owens, codenamed 'Snow', MI5 began to offer enemy agents the chance to avoid prosecution (and thus the possibility of the death penalty) if they would work as British double-agents. Agents who agreed to this were supervised by MI5 in transmitting bogus 'intelligence' back to the German secret service, the Abwehr. This necessitated a large-scale organisational effort, since the information had to appear valuable but actually be misleading. A high-level committee, the Wireless Board, was formed to provide this information. The day-to-day operation was delegated to a sub-committee, the Twenty Committee (so called because the Roman numerals for twenty, XX, form a double cross). The system was extraordinarily successful. A post-war analysis of German intelligence records found that of the 115 or so agents targeted against Britain during the war, all but one (who committed suicide) had been successfully identified and caught, with several 'turned' to become double agents. The system played a major part in the massive campaign of deception which preceded the D-Day landings, designed to give the Germans a false impression of the location and timings of the landings (see Operation Fortitude).

While the double-cross work dealt with enemy agents sent into Britain, a smaller-scale operation run by Victor Rothschild targeted British citizens who wanted to help Germany. The 'Fifth Column' operation saw an MI5 officer, Eric Roberts, masquerade as the Gestapo's man in London, encouraging Nazi sympathisers to pass him information about people who would be willing to help Germany in the event of invasion. When his recruits began bringing in intelligence, he promised to pass that on to Berlin. The operation was deeply controversial within MI5, with opponents arguing that it amounted to entrapment. By the end of the war, Roberts had identified around 500 people. But MI5 decided not to prosecute, and instead covered the work up, even giving some of Roberts' recruits Nazi medals. They were never told the truth.

All foreigners entering the country were processed at the London Reception Centre (LRC) at the Royal Victoria Patriotic Building, which was operated by MI5 subsection B1D; 30,000 were inspected at LRC. Captured enemy agents were taken to Camp 020, Latchmere House, for interrogation. This was commanded by Colonel Robin Stephens. There was a reserve camp, Camp 020R, at Huntercombe, which was used mainly for long term detention of prisoners. It is believed that two MI5 officers participated in "a gentle interrogation" given to the senior Nazi Heinrich Himmler after his arrest at a military checkpoint in the northern German village of Bremervörde in May 1945. Himmler subsequently killed himself during a medical examination by a British officer by means of a cyanide capsule that he had concealed in his mouth. One of the MI5 officers, Sidney Henry Noakes of the Intelligence Corps, was subsequently given permission to keep Himmler's braces and the forged identity document that had led to his arrest.

=== Post-Second World War ===
The Prime Minister's personal responsibility for the service was delegated to the Home Secretary David Maxwell-Fyfe in 1952, with a directive issued by the Home Secretary setting out the role and objectives of the Director General. The service was subsequently placed on a statutory basis in 1989 with the introduction of the Security Service Act. This was the first government acknowledgement of the existence of the service. The post-war period was a difficult time for the service, with a significant change in the threat as the Cold War began, being challenged by an extremely active KGB, and increasing incidence of the Northern Ireland conflict, and international terrorism. Whilst little has yet been released regarding the successes of the service, there have been a number of intelligence failures which have created embarrassment for both the service and the government. For instance, in 1983, one of its officers, Michael Bettaney, was caught trying to sell information to the KGB. He was subsequently convicted of espionage.

Following the Bettaney case, Philip Woodfield was appointed as a staff counsellor for the security and intelligence services. His role was to be available to be consulted by any member or former member of the security and intelligence services who had "anxieties relating to the work of his or her service" that it had not been possible to allay through the ordinary processes of management-staff relations, including proposals for publications. The service was instrumental in breaking up a large Soviet spy ring at the start of the 1970s, with 105 Soviet embassy staff known or suspected to be involved in intelligence activities being expelled from the country in 1971.

One episode involving MI5 and the BBC came to light in the mid-1980s. MI5 officer Ronnie Stonham had an office in the BBC, and took part in vetting procedures. Controversy arose when it was alleged that the service was monitoring trade unions and left-wing politicians. A file was kept on Labour Prime Minister Harold Wilson from 1945, when he became a Member of Parliament (MP), although the agency's official historian, Christopher Andrew maintains that his fears of MI5 conspiracies and bugging were unfounded. As Home Secretary, the Labour MP Jack Straw discovered the existence of his own file dating from his days as a student radical.

One of the most significant and far-reaching failures was an inability to conclusively detect and apprehend the 'Cambridge Five' spy ring, which had formed in the inter-war years, and achieved great success in penetrating the government, and the intelligence agencies themselves. Related to this failure were suggestions of a high-level penetration within the service, Peter Wright (especially in his controversial book Spycatcher) and others believing that evidence implicated the former Director General, Roger Hollis, or his deputy Graham Mitchell. The Trend inquiry of 1974 found the case unproven of that accusation, and that view was later supported by the former KGB officer Oleg Gordievsky. Another spy ring, the Portland spy ring, exposed after a tip-off by Soviet defector Michael Goleniewski, led to an extensive MI5 surveillance operation.

In 1991, MI5 revealed its head publicly for the first time and declassified some information, "such as the number of its employees and its organizational structure." There have been strong accusations levelled against MI5 for having failed in its obligation to provide care for former police agents who had infiltrated the Provisional IRA during the Troubles. The two most notable of the agents, Martin McGartland and Raymond Gilmour, went on to reside in England using false identities, and in 2012, launched test cases against the agency. Both men claimed to journalist Liam Clarke in the Belfast Telegraph that they were abandoned by MI5 and were "left high and dry despite severe health problems as a result of their work and lavish promises of life-time care from their former Intelligence bosses". Both men suffer from post-traumatic stress disorder (PTSD).

Following the United States invasion of Afghanistan, on 9 January 2002, the first MI5 staff arrived at Bagram. On 12 January 2002, following a report by an MI6 officer that a detainee appeared to have been mistreated before, an MI6 officer was sent instructions that were copied to all MI5 and MI6 staff in Afghanistan about how to deal with concerns over mistreatment, referring to signs of abuse: 'Given that they are not within our custody or control, the law does not require you to intervene to protect this'. It went on to say that the Americans had to understand that the UK did not condone such mistreatment, and that a complaint should be made to a senior US official if there was any coercion by the US in conjunction with an MI6 interview.

=== Counter-terrorism ===
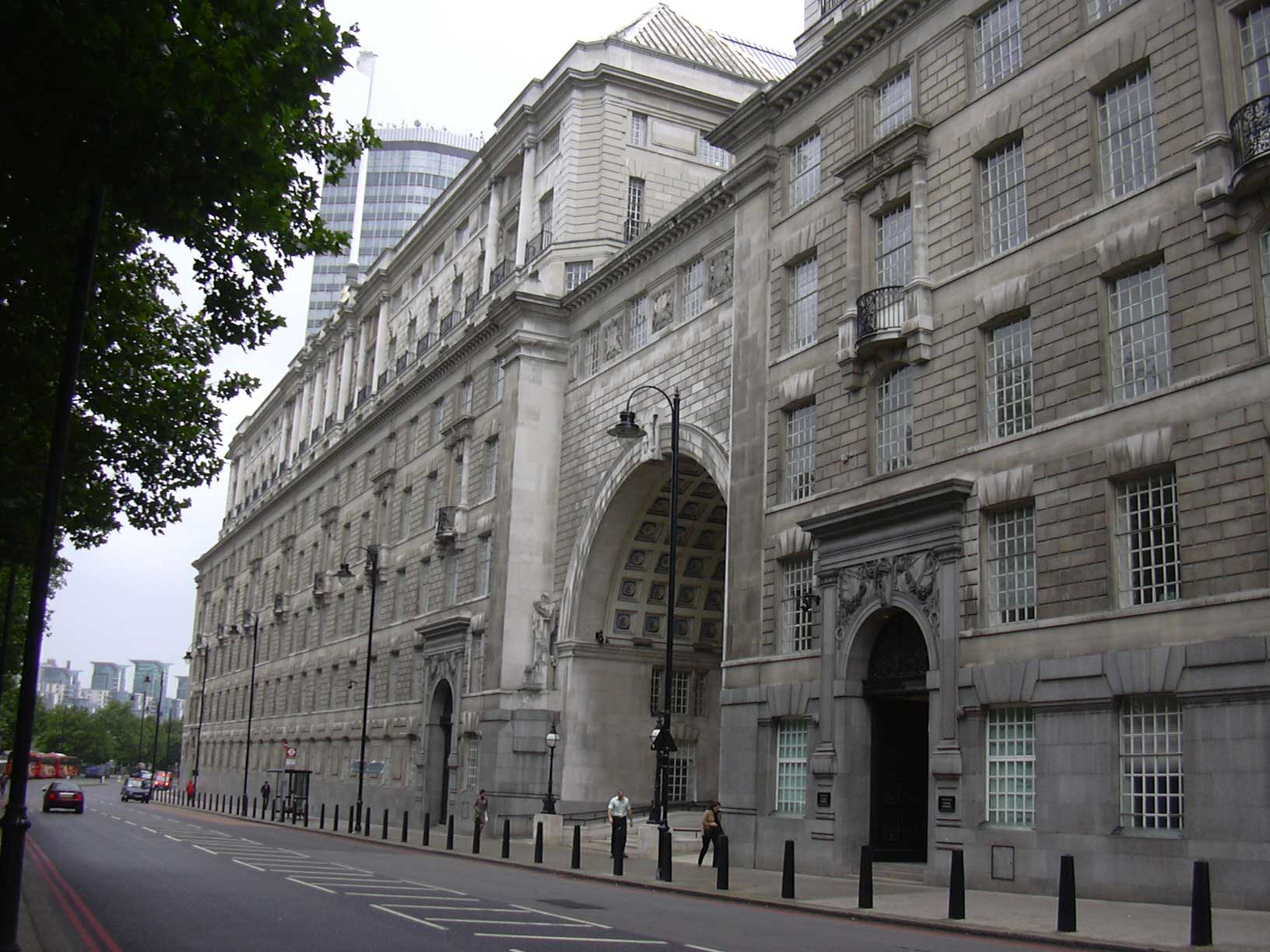
Part of Thames House

The end of the Cold War resulted in a change in emphasis for the operations of the service, assuming responsibility for the investigation of all Irish republican activity within Britain, and increasing the effort countering other forms of terrorism, particularly in more recent years the more widespread threat of Islamic extremism.

Whilst British security forces have provided support in countering the activities of both Irish republican and Ulster loyalist paramilitary groups in Northern Ireland since the early 1970s, republicans have often accused these forces of collusion with loyalists. In 2006, an Irish government committee inquiry claimed to have found nine instances of collusion between British security forces and loyalist paramilitaries during the 1970s. In 2012, a document-based review by the British barrister Sir Desmond de Silva into the 1989 murder of Belfast solicitor Pat Finucane found that MI5 had spread propaganda against Finucane in the years prior to his death and took no steps to protect him from loyalist paramilitaries. The review disclosed that MI5 assessments of Ulster Defence Association intelligence consistently noted that the majority came from MI5 sources, with an assessment in 1985 finding 85% of the intelligence originating from MI5. British Prime Minister David Cameron, in response to the review, apologised on behalf of the UK government to Finucane's family.

On 10 October 2007, the lead responsibility for national security intelligence in Northern Ireland returned to the Security Service from the Police Service of Northern Ireland (PSNI), that had been devolved in 1976 to the Royal Ulster Constabulary (RUC) during Ulsterisation. During April 2010, the Real IRA detonated a 120 lb car bomb outside Palace Barracks in County Down, which is the headquarters of MI5 in Northern Ireland and also home to the 2nd Battalion The Mercian Regiment.

MI5 is understood to have a close working relationship with the Republic of Ireland's Special Detective Unit (SDU), the counter-terrorism and counter-intelligence section of the Garda Síochána (national police), particularly with regards to threats from dissident republican terrorism and Islamic terrorism.

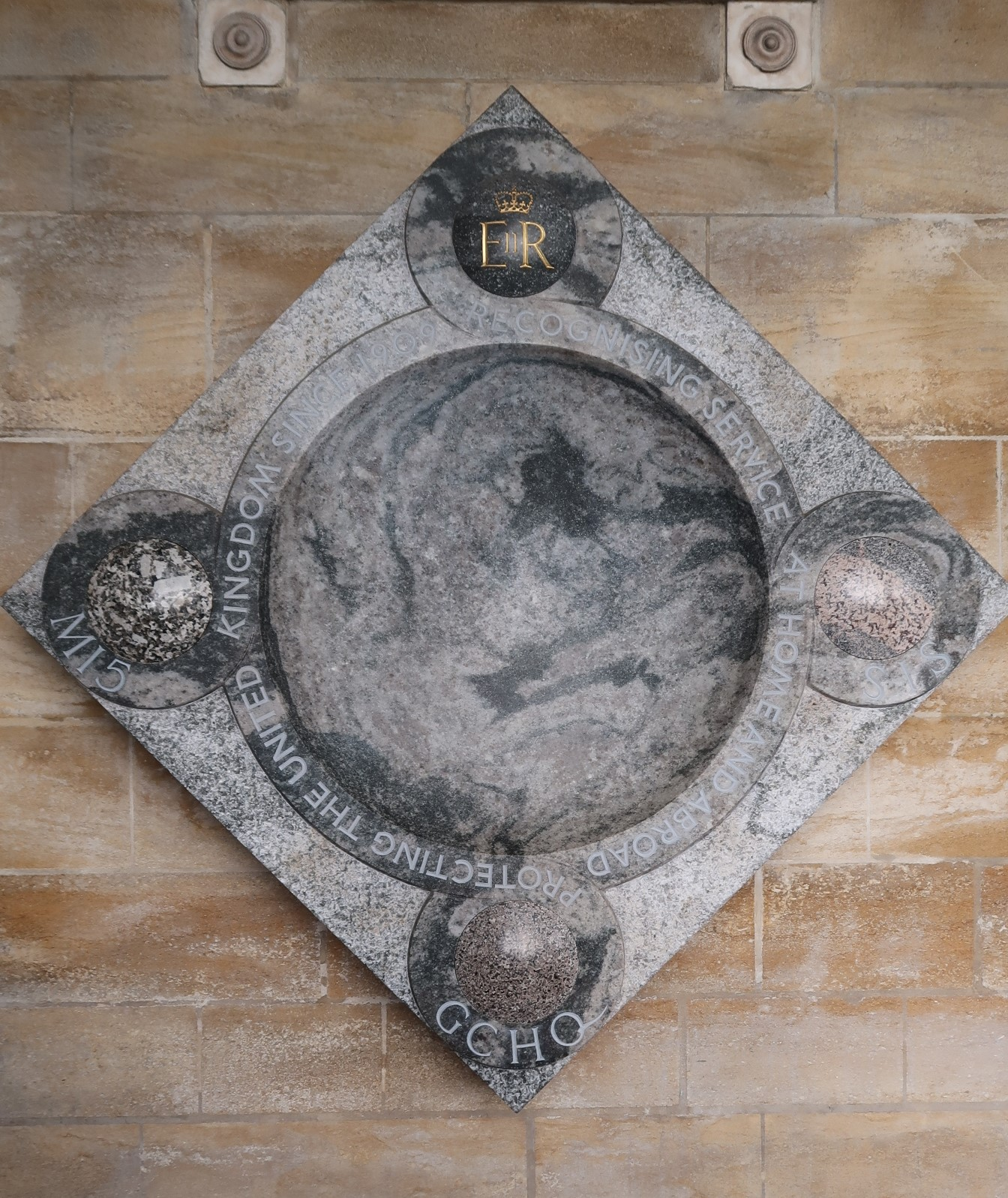
Intelligence Services Memorial, Westminster Abbey, honouring all members of the UK's intelligence services since 1909. The inscription reads: "Recognising service at home and abroad protecting the United Kingdom".

Executive liaison groups enable MI5 to safely share secret, sensitive, and often raw intelligence with the police, on which decisions can be made about how best to gather evidence and prosecute suspects in the courts. Each organisation works in partnership throughout the investigation, but MI5 retain the lead for collecting, assessing and exploiting intelligence. The police take lead responsibility for gathering evidence, obtaining arrests, and preventing risks to the public.

=== Serious crime ===
In 1996, legislation formalised the extension of the Security Service's statutory remit to include supporting the law enforcement agencies in their work against serious crime. Tasking was reactive, acting at the request of law enforcement bodies such as the National Criminal Intelligence Service (NCIS), for whom MI5 officers performed electronic surveillance and eavesdropping duties during Operation Trinity. This role has subsequently been passed to the Serious Organised Crime Agency (SOCA) and then the National Crime Agency (NCA).

=== Surveillance ===
In 2001, after the September 11 attacks in the US, MI5 started collecting bulk telephone communications data under a little understood general power of the Telecommunications Act 1984 (instead of the Regulation of Investigatory Powers Act 2000 which would have brought independent oversight and regulation). This was kept secret until announced by the Home Secretary in 2015. This power was replaced by the Investigatory Powers Act 2016 which introduced new surveillance powers overseen by the Investigatory Powers Commission (IPC) it introduces.

In July 2006, parliamentarian Norman Baker accused the British Government of "hoarding information about people who pose no danger to this country", after it emerged that MI5 holds secret files on 272,000 individuals, equivalent to one in 160 adults. It had previously been revealed that a 'traffic light' system operates:

- Green: active; about 10% of files
- Amber: enquiries prohibited, further information may be added; about 46% of files
- Red: enquiries prohibited, substantial information may not be added; about 44% of files.

=== Participation of MI5 officers in criminal activity ===
In March 2018, the government acknowledged that MI5 officers are allowed to authorise agents to commit criminal activity in the UK. Maya Foa, the director of Reprieve, said: "After a seven-month legal battle, the prime minister has finally been forced to publish her secret order, but we are a long way from having transparency. The public and parliament are still being denied the guidance that says when British spies can commit criminal offences, and how far they can go. Authorised criminality is the most intrusive power a state can wield. Theresa May must publish this guidance without delay".

In November 2019, four human rights organisations claimed that the UK government has a policy dating from the 1990s to allow MI5 officers to authorise agents or informers to participate in crime, and to immunise them against prosecution for criminal actions. The organisations said the policy allowed MI5 officers to authorise agents and informers to participate in criminal activities that protected national security or the economic well-being of the UK. The organisations took the UK government to the Investigatory Powers Tribunal, seeking to have it declare the policy illegal, and to issue an injunction against further 'unlawful conduct'. In December 2019, the tribunal dismissed the request of the human rights organisations in a 3-to-2 decision. The potential criminal activities include murder, kidnap, and torture, according to a Bloomberg report.

=== Allegations of collusion in torture ===
In October 2020, Rangzieb Ahmed brought a civil claim against MI5, alleging that Pakistan's Inter-Services Intelligence agency had arrested him in 2006, and that MI5 had colluded in torture by submitting questions which were put to him under torture in Pakistan. This claim was rejected by the High Court on 16 December 2020.

=== Domestic abuse scandal ===
In May 2022, the BBC reported on an unnamed MI5 agent, 'X', domestically abusing his partner, despite the British government's attempts to block this. BBC journalists subsequently discovered that MI5 lied to courts, suggesting that the organisation was unaware of X's behaviour, including his far-right extremist views. An ongoing High Court case began in June 2025, with MI5 accepting that X's status should no longer be protected, after previously neither confirming nor denying his role as an agent.

== Buildings ==
MI5 was based at Watergate House in the Strand from 1912 until 1916, when it moved to larger facilities at 16 Charles Street for the remaining years of the First World War. After the First World War, it relocated to smaller premises at 73–75 Queen's Gate in 1919, and then moved to 35 Cromwell Road in 1929, before transferring to the top floor of the South Block of Thames House on Millbank in 1934. The Service spent the first year of the Second World War at Wormwood Scrubs, before moving to Blenheim Palace, Oxfordshire, in 1940. After the Second World War, MI5 was based at Leconfield House (1945–1976), and 140 Gower Street (1976–1994, since demolished), before returning to Thames House in 1994.

The national headquarters at Thames House draws together personnel from a number of locations into a single HQ facility: Thames House also houses the Joint Terrorism Analysis Centre (JTAC), a subordinate organisation to the Security Service; prior to March 2013, Thames House additionally housed the Northern Ireland Office (NIO). The service has offices across the United Kingdom, including a HQ in Northern Ireland. Details of a northern operations centre in Greater Manchester were revealed by the firm who built it.

== Directors General of the Security Service ==
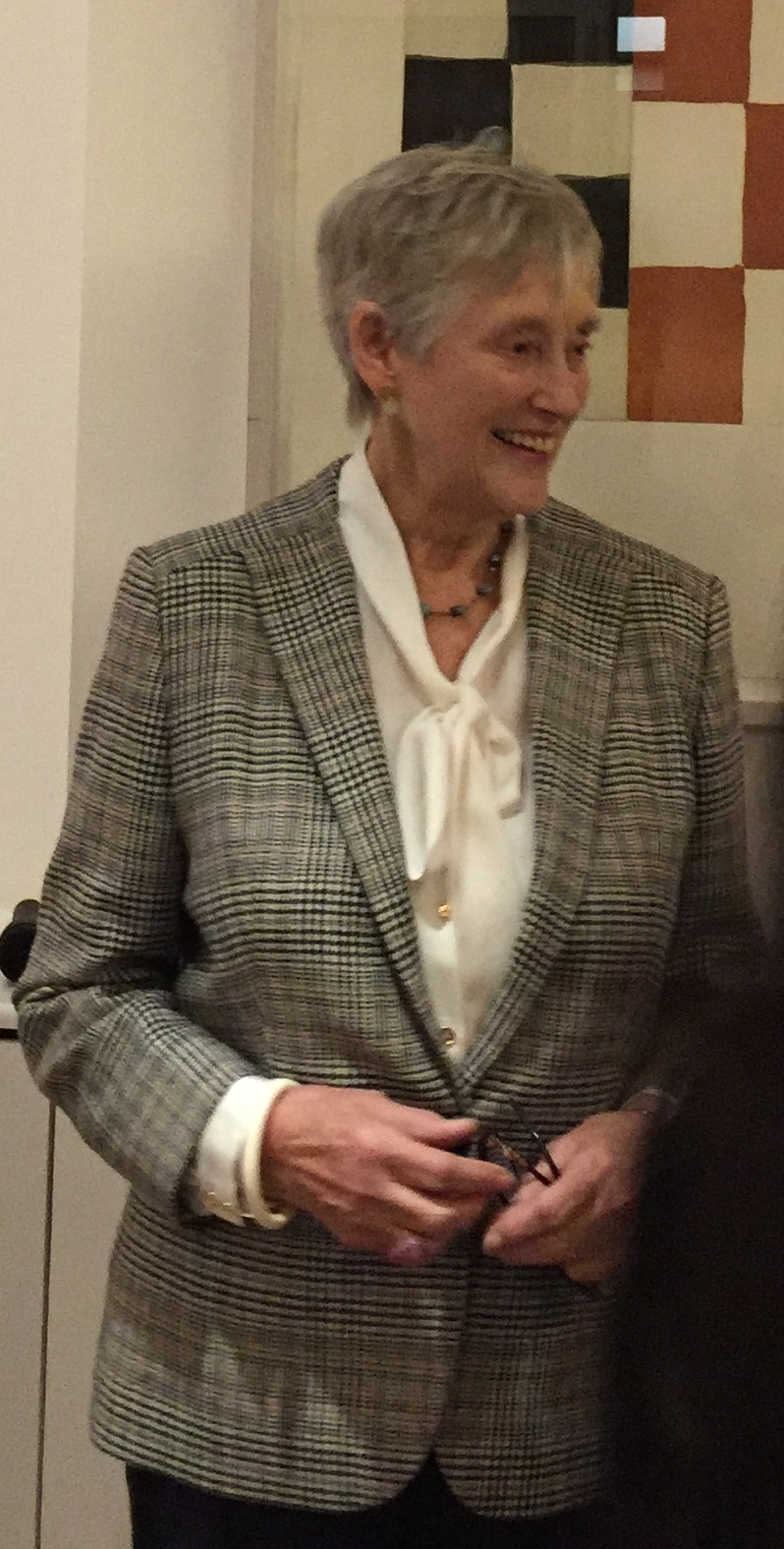
Dame Stella Rimington, the first female Director General of MI5

- 1909–1940: Sir Vernon Kell (born 1873 – d. 1942)
- 1940–1941: Oswald Allen Harker (born 1886 – d. 1968)
- 1941–1946: Sir David Petrie (born 1879 – d. 1961)
- 1946–1953: Sir Percy Sillitoe (born 1888 – d. 1962)
- 1953–1956: Dick White (born 1906 – d. 1993)
- 1956–1965: Roger Hollis (born 1905 – d. 1973)
- 1965–1972: Martin Furnival Jones (born 1912 – d. 1997)
- 1972–1979: Michael Hanley (born 1918 – d. 2001)
- 1979–1981: Howard Smith (born 1919 – d. 1996)
- 1981–1985: John Jones (born 1923 – d. 1998)
- 1985–1988: Antony Duff (born 1920 – d. 2000)
- 1988–1992: Patrick Walker (born 1932 – d. 2021)
- 1992–1996: Stella Rimington (born 1935 – d. 2025)
- 1996–2002: Stephen Lander (born 1947)
- 2002–2007: Eliza Manningham-Buller (born 1948)
- 2007–2013: Jonathan Evans (born 1958)
- 2013–2020: Andrew Parker (born 1962)
- 2020–present: Ken McCallum (born 1974)

== Past names ==
Although the Service is commonly referred to as 'MI5', this was its official name for only thirteen years (1916–1929). However, it is still used as a sub-title on the various pages of the official Security Service website, as well as in their web address (https://www.MI5.gov.uk).

- October 1909: founded as the Home Section of the Secret Service Bureau;
- April 1914: became a sub-section of the War Office Directorate of Military Operations, section 5 (MO5) — MO5(g);
- September 1916: became Military Intelligence section 5 — MI5;
- 1929: renamed the Defence Security Service;
- 1931: renamed the Security Service.

=== Cover name ===
MI5 has previously used Government Communications Planning Directorate (GCPD) as a cover name when sponsoring research related to drone usage in charging recording devices.

== Coat of arms ==
Coat of arms of MI5

Notes
Adopted
1981
Motto
REGNUM DEFENDE

== See also ==
- British intelligence agencies
- Annie Machon – MI5 whistleblower
- Delores Kane – MI5 whistleblower
- Club de Berne – a European intelligence sharing forum
- Counter Terrorism Policing
- Counter Terrorism Command – of London's Metropolitan Police Service
- Joint Terrorism Analysis Centre (JTAC)
- National Protective Security Authority – child agency of MI5 which provides security advice
- Pat Finucane – Irish lawyer murdered by Ulster Defence Association members with the collusion of the security service
- Peter Wright - Former MI5 officer and author
