= Jonathan Evans, Baron Evans of Weardale =

Director General of MI5

The Right Honourable The Lord Evans of Weardale KCB DL
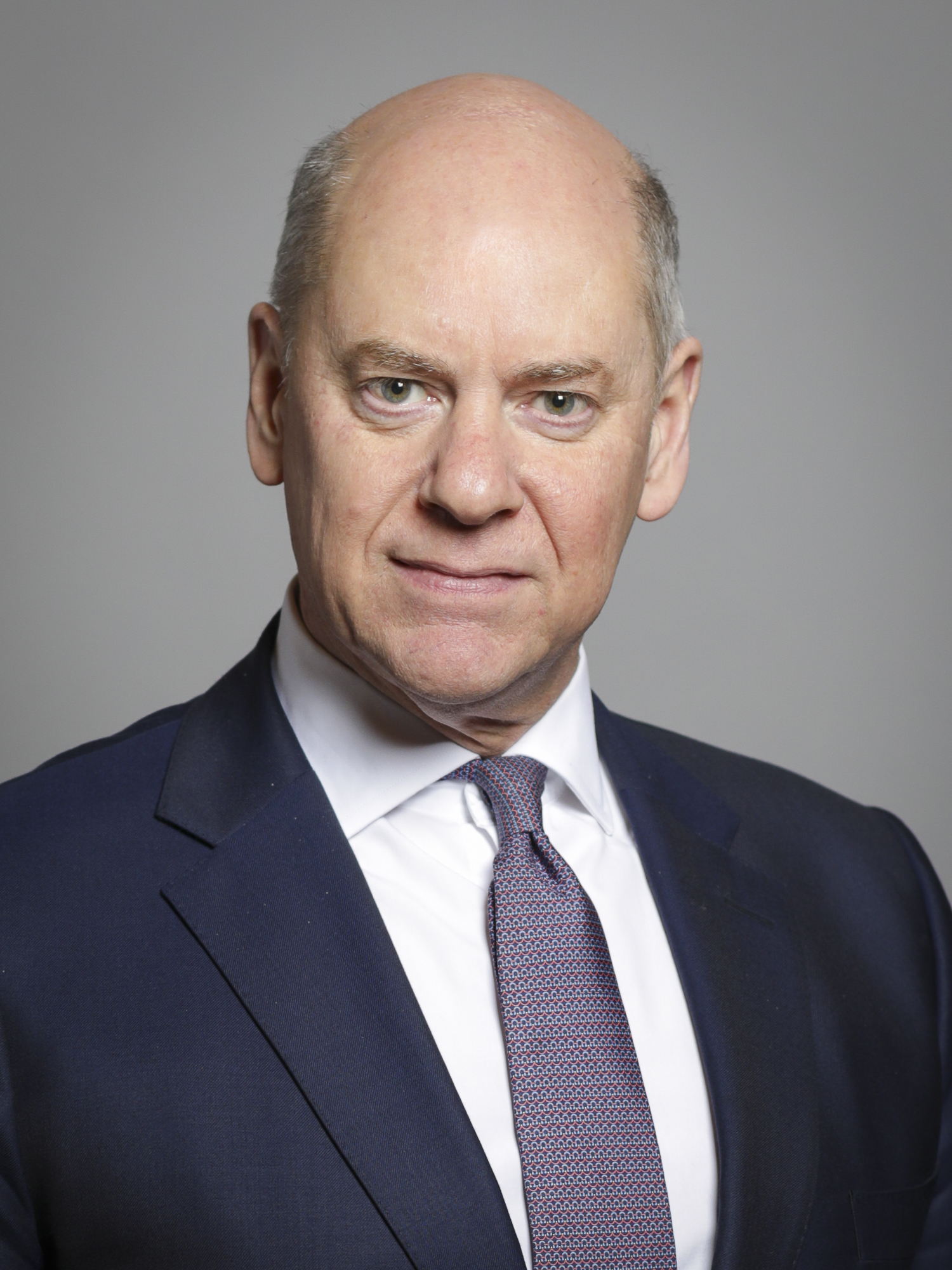
- Official portrait, 2019

Chair of the Crown Nominations Commission
- Incumbent
- Assumed office 16 December 2024
- Home Secretary: John Reid; Jacqui Smith; Alan Johnson; Theresa May

Director General of MI5
- In office 21 April 2007 – 22 April 2013
- Preceded by: Dame Eliza Manningham-Buller
- Succeeded by: Sir Andrew Parker

Member of the House of Lords
- Lord Temporal
- Life peerage 3 December 2014

Personal details
- Born: 17 February 1958 (age 68)
- Party: None (crossbencher)
- Education: University of Bristol
- Occupation: Intelligence officer

Military service
- Allegiance: United Kingdom
- Branch/service: Security Service
- Years of service: 1980–2013
- Rank: Director General

Jonathan Douglas Evans, Baron Evans of Weardale, KCB, DL (born 17 February 1958) is a British life peer who formerly served as the Director General of the British Security Service, the United Kingdom's domestic security and counter-intelligence service. He took over the role on the retirement of his predecessor Dame Eliza Manningham-Buller on 21 April 2007. Evans was succeeded by Andrew Parker on 22 April 2013. He currently serves as the Chairman of the Crown Nominations Commission.

== Early life ==
Evans was born on 17 February 1958, and was brought up in Kent, England. He was educated at Sevenoaks School, then an all-boys independent school. He studied classics at Bristol University, graduating with a Bachelor of Arts (BA) degree.

== Career ==
=== MI5 ===
Evans joined the Security Service (i.e. MI5) in 1980, and initially worked in counter espionage. In 1985 he moved to the protective security function, dealing with internal and personnel security, before switching to domestic counter-terrorism in the late 1980s. For more than a decade he was involved with the effort to combat the domestic threat of groups such as the Provisional IRA during The Troubles. In 1999, with the violence in Northern Ireland greatly reduced due to the Good Friday Agreement, Evans moved to G-Branch, the section of MI5 which deals with international terrorism. There he became an expert on al-Qaeda and other branches of Islamic terrorism. He rose to head the section in 2001 (only a few days before the September 11, 2001 attacks), a position which put him on the service's board of management. In 2005, he became Deputy Director General.

In March 2007, he was announced as the next Director General of MI5, in succession to Dame Eliza Manningham-Buller. He took up the post in April 2007. In November 2007, he talked publicly about the threat the UK faces from digital espionage. He spoke at RUSI on National Security in February 2008. He has a Certificate in Company Direction from the Institute of Directors. In July 2010, the government revealed Evans received an annual salary of £159,999. In September 2010, Evans said that the American citizen Anwar al-Awlaki was the West's Public Enemy No 1. Al-Awlaki was killed by a U.S. drone strike on 30 September 2011.

Evans was appointed Knight Commander of the Order of the Bath (KCB) in the 2013 New Year Honours for services to defence, and was thereby granted the title Sir. He retired from MI5 in 2013 and was succeeded as director general by Andrew Parker on 22 April 2013.

=== House of Lords ===
On 21 October 2014, it was announced that he was to become a life peer, having been nominated personally by the Prime Minister "for public service". He was created Baron Evans of Weardale, of Toys Hill in the County of Kent, on 3 December 2014, and sits in the House of Lords as a crossbench peer. On 13 January 2015, he made his maiden speech in the Lords during a debate on the Counter-Terrorism and Security Bill. On 1 November 2018 he was appointed Chair of the Committee on Standards in Public Life for a 5-year term.

=== Post-MI5 career ===
After retiring as Director General, Evans joined the Board of HSBC Holdings as a Non-Executive Director. He is also a non-executive director of Ark Data Centres, a Distinguished Fellow at the Royal United Services Institute and an Honorary Professor at the University of St Andrews. From 2014 to 2015 he was a non-executive director of the National Crime Agency. He has written occasionally in the Sunday Times on classic cars. In November 2023, The HALO Trust announced him as the new Chair of their Board of Trustees.

In January 2015, he was appointed a Deputy Lieutenant (DL) to the Lord Lieutenant of Kent.

On 16 December 2024, he was announced as the chair of the Crown Nominations Commission to select the next Archbishop of Canterbury, following the resignation of Justin Welby. The chair is required to be a "communicant lay [i.e. not ordained] member of the Church of England".

== Personal life ==
Evans is a Christian. He was raised as a Baptist and attended the Christian Union while at university. As of 2024, he is a member of the Church of England.

Government offices
Preceded by Dame Eliza Manningham-Buller	Director General of MI5; 2007–2013	Succeeded by Andrew Parker
Orders of precedence in the United Kingdom
Preceded by The Lord Green of Deddington	Gentlemen; Baron Evans of Weardale	Followed by The Lord Lisvane
