= Stephen Lander =

British intelligence and law enforcement executive

Sir Stephen Lander KCB
- Born: 1947 (age 78–79)
- Education: University of Cambridge
- Occupations: Intelligence officer, Academic
- Awards: KCB
- Espionage activity
- Allegiance: United Kingdom
- Service branch: MI5
- Service years: 1975–2002
- Rank: Director General of MI5

Sir Stephen James Lander, KCB (born 1947) is a former chairman of the United Kingdom's Serious Organised Crime Agency (SOCA), who also served as Director General of the British Security Service (MI5) from 1996 to 2002.

== Career ==
Lander attended Parkside School, then located in East Horsley, prior to its move to Cobham, Bishop's Stortford College and Queens' College, Cambridge, where he earned a doctorate in history entitled The diocese of Chichester 1508–1558 : Episcopal reform under Robert Sherburne and its aftermath. In 1975, after three years at the Institute of Historical Research (part of the University of London) where he was assistant editor of the Victoria History of Cheshire, and serving as an Honorary Research Fellow of the University of Liverpool, he joined MI5. He was Director General of MI5 from 1996 to 2002.

In April 2006, he was appointed chairman of Serious Organised Crime Agency (SOCA). He retired from that post in 2009.

In 1972, he married Felicity Mary Brayley and had a son and daughter. In September 2002, his son James died at age 28 of acute blood poisoning caused by drug and alcohol toxicity.

Government offices
Preceded by Dame Stella Rimington	Director General of MI5; 1996–2002	Succeeded by Eliza Manningham-Buller
