= David Petrie =

Director of MI5 (1879–1961)

Sir David Petrie KCMG CIE CVO CBE KPM
- Born: 9 September 1879; Inveravon, Banffshire
- Died: 7 August 1961 (aged 81); Sidmouth, Devon
- Education: Aberdeen University
- Occupation: Police officer
- Espionage activity
- Allegiance: United Kingdom
- Service branch: MI5
- Rank: Director General of MI5

Sir David Petrie KCMG CIE CVO CBE KPM (9 September 1879 – 7 August 1961) was Director General (DG) of MI5, the United Kingdom's internal security service, from 1941 to 1946.

== Biography ==
Petrie worked in the Indian Imperial Police from 1900 serving in a variety of police intelligence roles. He headed the Delhi Intelligence Bureau of the Indian Police and served as the Chairman of the Indian Public Service Commission until 1936. After the outbreak for the World War II he joined the Army Intelligence Corps.

His highest level in British India was to chair the Union Public Service Commission. In April 1941, he was appointed Director General of MI5. His task was to reorganise the service so that it could improve its efficiency. In the spring of 1946, Petrie retired.

He was awarded Order of the Yugoslav Crown and other decorations.

Government offices
Preceded by Jasper Harker	Director General of MI5; 1941–1946	Succeeded by Sir Percy Sillitoe
