= Michael Hanley =

British spy (1918–2001)

Sir Michael Hanley KCB
- Born: 24 February 1918; Leeds
- Died: 1 January 2001 (aged 82); Salisbury
- Education: Queen's College, Oxford
- Occupation: Intelligence officer
- Spouse(s): Lorna, Lady Hanley
- Children: 2 (Peter Michael Hanley & Sarah Margaret Pittman)
- Awards: KCB
- Espionage activity
- Allegiance: United Kingdom
- Service branch: MI5
- Rank: Director General of MI5

Sir Michael Bowen Hanley KCB (24 February 1918 – 1 January 2001) was Director General (DG) of MI5, the United Kingdom's internal security service, from 1972 to 1978.

== Career ==
Educated at Sedbergh School and Queen's College, Oxford where he read history, Hanley served during the Second World War, being commissioned into the Royal Artillery of the British Army on 28 December 1940. His service number was 164032. He was subsequently served as an assistant military attaché to the Joint Allied Intelligence Centre in Budapest from 1946 to 1948.

In 1948, Hanley joined the security service. He rose through the grades, serving as director of C Branch (Protective Security) in the 1960s, to be Deputy Director General of MI5 from 1971 to 1972. He was Director General of MI5 from 1972 to 1978.

As Director General, Hanley had a difficult relationship with the Prime Minister, Harold Wilson. Wilson wrongly suspected MI5 of plotting against him in a conspiracy known as 'The Wilson Plot'.

Government offices
Preceded by Sir Martin Furnival Jones	Director General of MI5; 1972 - 1978	Succeeded by Sir Howard Smith
