= John Jones (MI5 officer) =

Sir John Jones KCB
- Born: 17 February 1923; Easington, County Durham
- Died: 9 March 1998 (aged 75); Boston, Lincolnshire
- Education: Christ's College, Cambridge
- Occupations: Intelligence Officer, Civil servant
- Awards: KCB
- Espionage activity
- Allegiance: United Kingdom
- Service branch: MI5
- Service years: 1955–1985
- Rank: Director General of MI5

Sir John Lewis Jones, KCB (17 February 1923 – 9 March 1998) was Director General of MI5, the United Kingdom's internal security service, from 1981 until 1985.

== Career ==
Jones was a native of Wigton in Cumbria, and went to The Nelson Thomlinson School in that town. A graduate of Christ's College, Cambridge, where he read History, he became an officer in the Royal Artillery during World War II and served as a civil servant in the pre-independence Government of Sudan. He joined the Security Service in 1955. He became Deputy Director General in 1976. He was Director General of MI5 from 1981 to 1985.

He was appointed Knight Commander of the Order of the Bath (KCB) in the 1983 New Year Honours.

Government offices
Preceded by Sir Howard Smith	Director General of MI5; 1981–1985	Succeeded by Sir Antony Duff
