= The Nelson Thomlinson School =

Secondary school in Wigton, England

- School crest

Location
- High Street; Wigton, Cumbria, CA7 9PX; England; 54°49′18″N 3°09′21″W

Information
- Type: Voluntary controlled school
- Motto: Latin: Fide et Opris (English:Faith and Works)
- Established: 1714
- Local authority: Cumberland Council
- Department for Education URN: 112397 Tables
- Ofsted: Reports
- Headmaster: David Samuel Northwood
- Gender: Boys and girls
- Age: 11 to 18
- Enrolment: 1,192 (2023)
- Colour
- Website: nelson%20thomlinson%20school

The Nelson Thomlinson School is an 11–18 comprehensive coeducational secondary school with a sixth form in the market town of Wigton, Cumbria, England. The school's motto is the Latin phrase Fide et Operis, which translates to English as "Faith and Works". David Northwood has been headteacher since 2011. In May 2023, the school had 1,192 pupils, of whom 182 were in the sixth form.

== History ==
In 1714, the Wigton Free Grammar School was established as a means to an end of pupils being taught within church rooms. The establishment of the grammar school allowed for the dedication of a single schoolhouse in which pupils could be taught. The school house opened at Market Hill in 1730, with brothers John and the Reverend Robert Thomlinson of Aikhead credited for its creation. As was custom at that time, this was a boys' school. At the time of opening, the school had 20 boys enrolled, and by 2025, there was estimated to be 1,170 pupils enrolled at the school, both boys and girls.

The Thomlinson Girls’ School was founded in 1899. The Nelson School for Boys (at Floshfirld House and sponsored by Joseph Nelson), a grammar school merged with the Thomlinson school in 1953 to form a coeducational Nelson Thomlinson Grammar School. This school subsequently merged with Wigton Secondary School (a secondary modern school) in 1969 to form the Nelson Thomlinson Comprehensive School, now simply called the Nelson Thomlinson School.

=== Controversies ===
In 2004, anti-social behaviour in the town centre by under-18s, many of whom were pupils at Nelson Thomlinson School, prompted authorities to impose a curfew on youths in Wigton. The curfew ran through the 2004 Easter holidays and prohibited any unaccompanied children under the age of 16 from being out on the streets between 21:00 and 06:00. During the curfew, instances of anti-social behaviour, such as intimidation and broken shop windows, dropped by as much as 75%. However, the curfew was not repeated after 2004.

In 2014, Hayley Southwell, a teacher at Nelson Thomlinson, was arrested and pleaded guilty to charges of having sexual activity with a girl aged between 16 and 18 while in a position of trust. Her victim was a pupil at the school, and the crimes took place between May 2013 and January 2014. She was handed a 12-month suspended prison sentence and had to sign the sex offenders register for a period of ten years. During sentencing, the judge said that Southwell's relationship with her victim showed "a degree of grooming".

== Background ==
=== Students ===
As with many older British Secondary schools, The Nelson Thomlinson School has a prefect system drawn from the Sixth Form. However, instead of one Head Prefect or a Head Boy & Girl pair, there are five Head Prefects who each take charge on a particular day of the week. Former pupils of the school include TV presenter Melvyn Bragg and BBC newsreader Anna Ford.

There were approximately 1400 pupils aged 11–18 attending Nelson Thomlinson as of the 2014-15 academic year.

=== Catchment area ===
Most pupils at Nelson Thomlinson are from Wigton and the smaller communities within a few miles of the town which fall within its catchment area. However, some pupils come from further afield, including smaller settlements like Allonby, Bowness-on-Solway, Hesket Newmarket, and Mawbray, and also from larger towns such as Aspatria, Maryport, Silloth, and the city of Carlisle, which all have their own secondary schools. Prices for the 2014-15 academic year on a bus from Carlisle to Nelson Thomlinson were £16.50 per week, and from Dalston the price was £13.50 per week.

== Attainment ==
The school enters students in the GCSE and A-Level examinations. Examination results at the school in 2023 were down in all areas from the previous academic year in 2022, with the number of pupils obtaining a Grade 5 or above in GCSE English and Maths down to 44.5% in 2023 from 54.9% in 2022. In 2022, 72.5% of pupils obtained a Level 4 or above in GCSE English and Maths, which dropped to 66.5% in 2023. Similarly, the percentage of pupils achieving five or more GCSE qualifications, including English and Maths, in 2022 stood at 52% in 2022, with a sharp decrease to only 39.5% in 2023.

In a 2006 Ofsted inspection the school was judged to be an "Outstanding" school. In May 2013 the school was deemed "outstanding". Most recently in October 2023 the school's grading was downgraded and deemed "good" by Ofsted.

== Notable former pupils ==
- Melvyn Bragg - British broadcaster.
- Sheila Fell - Artist
- Anna Ford - British newsreader.
- Thomas Holliday - Rugby union and rugby league footballer of the 1920s
- Sir John Jones - Director General of MI5
- Helen Housby - Current England Netball Player.
- Jarrad Branthwaite - Everton footballer
