= Michael Bettaney =

British intelligence officer (1950–2018)

Michael John Bettaney (13 February 1950 – 16 August 2018), also known as Michael Malkin, was a British intelligence officer who worked in the counter-espionage branch of the Security Service often known as MI5.

He was convicted at the Old Bailey in 1984 of offences under section 1 of the Official Secrets Act 1911 after passing sensitive documents to the Soviet Embassy in London and attempting to act as an agent-in-place for the Soviet Union. His trial was conducted in camera but some of the press reporting is available.

== Early life ==
Born into modest circumstances in Fenton, Stoke on Trent, Bettaney later attended Pembroke College, Oxford, where he studied English in 1969–72, and was allegedly known for his admiration for Adolf Hitler and for singing the Horst-Wessel-Lied in local public houses. Bettaney joined the Security Service in 1975, soon after he graduated from Oxford.

== Career ==
Bettaney was posted to Belfast in June 1976 and was injured in a car bomb attack. Aaron Edwards, a writer on The Troubles and intelligence states that during his posting he served in Derry as a source handler. One person he dealt with was Willie Carlin, a well-placed agent within the Provisional IRA. Bettaney, after his conviction in 1984, shared his knowledge with an IRA prisoner whilst in Brixton Prison and Carlin had to be withdrawn.

In 1978 Bettaney returned to London and participated in the newly created anti-terrorist branch. In December 1982 he was transferred to the Soviet counterespionage section in MI5 Headquarters at 140 Gower Street, London. He took a large number of secret documents home with him from the office, before trying to hand over highlights to the KGB's London rezident (Head of KGB Station or rezidentura), General Arkady V. Guk, by dropping the documentation through the letterbox of Guk's house, Bettaney knowing the address via his work. Bettaney did not know that another member of the Station, KGB [Acting] Colonel Oleg Gordievsky, was an MI6 agent. Gordievsky informed MI6 and the British authorities managed to identify and arrest Bettaney at his home in September 1983, where he had been preparing to fly to Vienna and hand over more secrets to the Soviets.

There has been put forward an alternative view of the above, to wit that, far from incompetently pushing secret materials through Guk's letterbox, "[Bettaney] delivered a suitably cryptic message for the Soviet embassy's KGB staff. It required them to make contact with him using standard spycraft techniques: pins on escalators, numbered steps, etc."

Although Bettaney subsequently claimed to have been inspired by political motives, an alternative theory of his motivation is alleged to arise from the following: he had received a final warning following a criminal conviction for fare-dodging and an arrest for being drunk in the street. A further offence of using an out-of-date railway season ticket followed, and although Bettaney had failed to declare it, as he was required to do, he knew it would be disclosed during his next routine security screening, which would inevitably lead to his dismissal.

The management of Bettaney while working for MI5 was examined by the Security Commission, who concluded that "[t]he Commission make a number of serious criticisms of the errors by the Security Service in relation to the management of Bettaney's career..."

== Aftermath ==
Bettaney was sentenced to 23 years in prison, and was released on licence in 1998. While in prison he had learned the Russian language via broadcasts from Radio Moscow.

He set up home with a pro-socialist woman who had written to him and visited him while in prison. His Roman Catholic faith, which he retained, alongside a Marxist tendency, apparently strengthened in later years.

Bettaney died of alcohol poisoning on 16 August 2018.
