= Sheila Fell =

20th-century English landscape painter

Painting on a beach at Allonby

Sheila Fell RA FRSA (20 July 1931 – 15 December 1979) was an English artist. She was born in Aspatria, Cumberland, in 1931. Although she lived in London for the greater part of her life, she devoted her career to painting the Cumberland landscape.

== Biography ==
=== Early life ===
Sheila Fell was born into a poor household at Aspatria in 1931, the only child of John (Jack) and Anne Fell. Her father was a coal miner who worked at the Brayton Domain Colliery about a mile and a half from Aspatria. Her mother was a seamstress. When Fell was young her father lost his job at Brayton and, after working at other pits and suffering a serious leg injury, ceased to look for work entirely. At the age of six Fell contracted diphtheria, but her mother refused to have her admitted to hospital, instead caring for her at home.

=== Education ===
After her early education at Richmond Hill School, Aspatria, Fell gained a scholarship allowing her to attend The Nelson Thomlinson School in Wigton, where the teacher responsible for art, Mrs Campbell-Taylor, encouraged her to go to art college. At the age of 16 she enrolled at the Carlisle College of Art (1947–1949), then housed in Tullie House. Afterwards she enrolled at Saint Martin's School of Art (1949–1951) where she studied under Roland Vivian Pitchforth and John Napper. She gained her National Diploma in Design at the age of 21, and then stayed on for a further twelve months to complete a post graduate course. Fell augmented the grant received from Cumberland County Council by working in a night club and also at the National Gallery. During her college years she exhibited her work in the Young Contemporaries Show in 1952 and 1953. After leaving college, she worked for a while as a freelance painter during the day, did head modelling, and worked in a café at night.

== Career ==
In 1955 at the age of 24, Fell held her first exhibition, becoming the youngest ever artist to exhibit at the Beaux Arts Gallery in Bond Street, London. In December 1955, she appeared on the ten-minute 'Highlight' television programme, which spotlighted the personalities of the day. She joined the teaching staff of Chelsea School of Art in 1958. She would never return to live permanently in Cumberland but she frequently visited her family there, and its landscape dominated her work for the rest of her life.

That first exhibition in London sold out and brought Fell to the attention of artist L. S. Lowry, who bought two paintings and a drawing, creating a friendship that would last for many years. Lowry gave Fell all the help he could; he advised and encouraged her, and gave financial support by buying around twenty of her paintings and giving her a weekly allowance of £3 and would often visit her when she returned home to Aspatria for her regular holidays. They would go out to the countryside to paint. Lowry got on well with her parents and always called her "Miss Fell", until shortly before his death. He hailed her as the greatest landscape painter of her generation.

Although never married, Fell had a daughter Anna in 1958, by the Greek sculptor Takis Vassilakis.

=== Style and influences ===
Fell used powerful, melancholy oils of living landscape, presided over by huge brooding mountains and dark looming clouds. Colour was always less important than tone, she painted the hills and the seas of the area she loved so well, she painted the earth and those who worked it, depicting rich brown soils, piles of potatoes, small groups of driven cattle, indistinguishable farm buildings and terraced houses running along the streets of Aspatria. Her obituary writer in The Times described her work, by relating back to her childhood in Cumberland, as having both ethical and aesthetic weight. Several major artists influenced her style, Cézanne, Constant Permeke, Auerbach and Van Gogh are all evident in parts of her early work.

=== Death ===
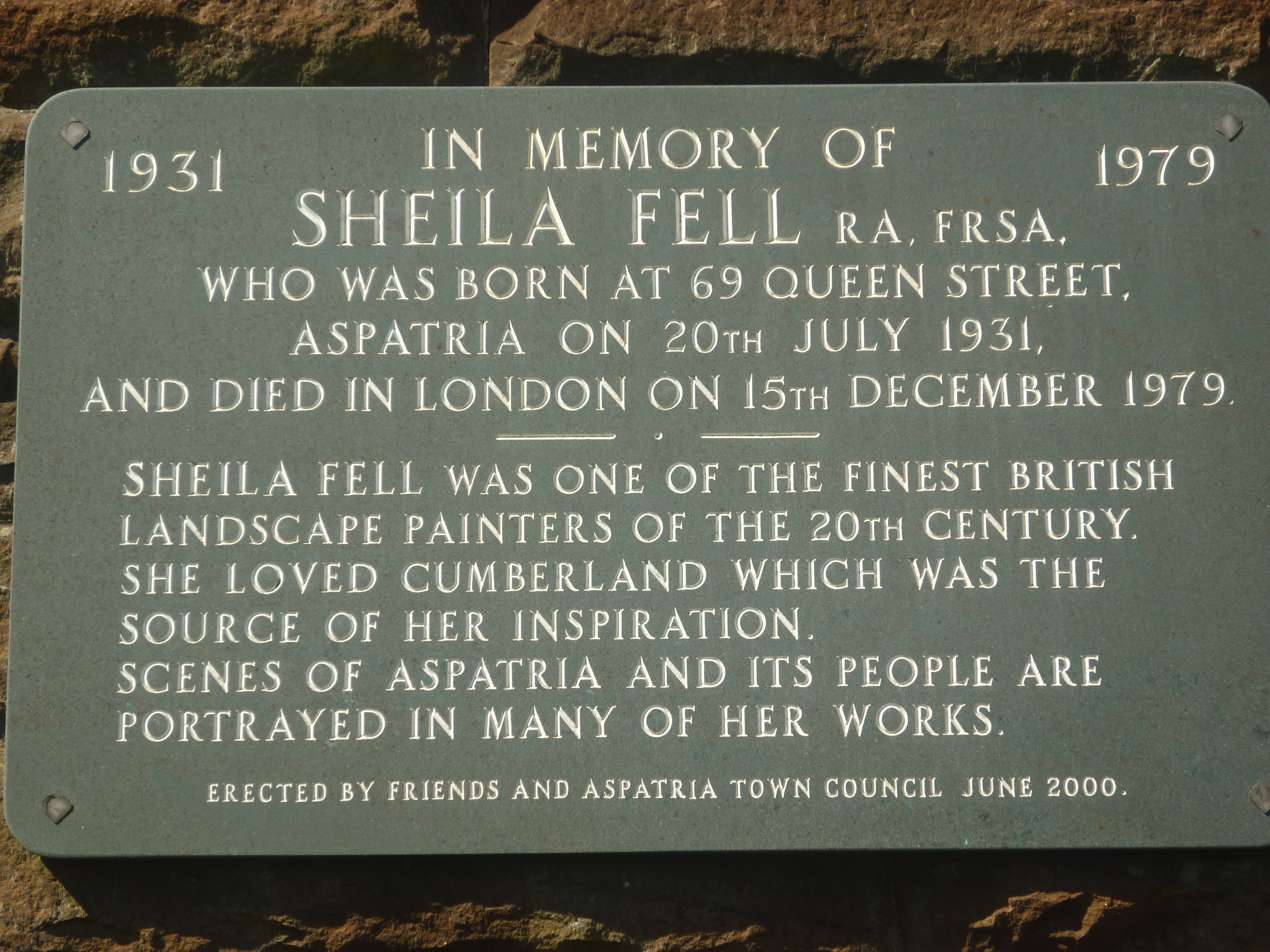
Sheila Fell Memorial at Aspatria

In December 1979, Hunter Davies began his article for the Sunday Times: "Sheila Fell lives at the top of a long flight of stairs in Chelsea." He ended it with Fell's own words. "I don't think of myself as a woman artist. Artists are either good or bad. I also intend to live until 104. I've promised myself I will. It's what keeps me going when I worry if I'll ever have time to do all the paintings in my head." However, by the time the article appeared she was already dead. The inquest into her death reported that she had died of alcohol poisoning, on 15 December, at her London flat. She was 48 years of age.

=== Legacy ===
Fell's paintings have continued to attract interest in auction houses. A sale of three paintings in 2025, held by the estate of a family friend in Hexham, came to a total of £50,000, when two of them had been originally purchased from the artist for relatively modest sums. The auctioneer said afterwards: “The strength of bidding for Sheila Fell confirms her place at the forefront of 20th century British art. These results reflect the growing recognition of her unique vision and the rarity of her work.”

== Awards ==
Fell's first major award came in October 1957 after she entered a painting in the John Moores Painting Prize competition at the Walker Art Gallery, Liverpool. The competition drew 3,000 entries, short listed to 250. Fell, the only female winner, came second in the junior section and picked up a cheque for £250. In 1959, she received a 'Boise' travelling scholarship. Although she travelled extensively throughout Italy, Greece, Switzerland and France the period was not a success. As she told one enquirer: "I have an obsession about Cumberland. I have tried painting in other parts of the world, particularly Greece, but it just doesn't work." In 1967, she was awarded an Arts Council Purchase Award. In 1969 she was elected Associate Member of the Royal Academy and a full membership five years later, at a time when there were relatively female academicians.

== Exhibitions ==
- 1955 Beaux Arts Gallery
- 1958 Beaux Arts Gallery
- 1960 Beaux Arts Gallery
- 1961 The Derwent Centre, Cockermouth
- 1962 Middlesbrough Art Gallery
- 1962 Beaux Arts Gallery
- 1964 Maryport Education Settlement, Cumberland
- 1964 Beaux Arts Gallery
- 1965 Abbot Hall Art Gallery, Kendal
- 1965 Queen Square Gallery, Leeds
- 1967 Stone Gallery, Newcastle upon Tyne
- 1969 Stone Gallery, Newcastle upon Tyne
- 1969 Also exhibited in Arts Council and Contemporary Arts Society touring exhibition
- 1979 New Grafton Gallery, London
- 1981 Abbot Hall Art Gallery, Kendal
- 1981 Salford Art Gallery
- 2006 Castlegate Gallery, Cockermouth
- 2011 Abbot Hall Art Gallery, Kendal
- 2014 Castlegate House Gallery, Cockermouth
- 2021 Castlegate House Gallery, Cockermouth
- 2024 Tullie House Gallery, Carlisle

== Official purchases and public collections ==
- Tate Gallery, London (three paintings)
- Contemporary Art Society, London
- Walker Art Gallery, Liverpool
- Atkinson Art Gallery and Library, Southport
- Carlisle Art Gallery
- Sunderland Art Gallery
- Abbot Hall Art Gallery, Kendal
- Laing Art Gallery, Newcastle upon Tyne
- Swindon Art Gallery
- Huddersfield Art Gallery

== Notable paintings ==
- 1955 Aspatria wedding
- 1955 Miners
- 1958 Farm Land at Aspatria
- 1958 Portrait of Anna Fell
- 1959 Cumbrian village under snow
- 1961 Snowscape IV Tate Gallery collection
- 1964 Men working in a cornfield
- 1965 Maryport Tate Gallery Collection
- 1965 Skiddaw summer
- 1967 Haystacks in a field Tate Gallery collection
- 1970 Houses in winter
- 1979 Potato pick-ing-clouds
- 1979 Christmas
