= Patrick Walker (MI5 officer) =

British civil servant (1932–2021)

Sir Patrick Walker KCB
- Born: Patrick Jeremy Walker; 25 February 1932; Kuala Lumpur, Federated Malay States
- Died: 13 October 2021 (aged 89)
- Education: Trinity College, Oxford
- Occupations: Intelligence officer, civil servant
- Espionage activity
- Allegiance: United Kingdom
- Service branch: MI5
- Service years: 1963–1992
- Rank: Director General of MI5

Sir Patrick Jeremy Walker, KCB (25 February 1932 – 13 October 2021) was a British civil servant who was Director General (DG) of MI5, the United Kingdom's internal security service, from 1988 to 1992.

== Early life and education ==
Walker was the only surviving son of civil servant Reginald Plumer Walker and his wife, Gladys. He was born at Bungsai Hospital in Kuala Lumpur, Malaysia, where his parents were married in 1929. The Walkers once owned considerable lands in northern Nottinghamshire around Mattersey and Lound, but, according to his research, lost it all "thanks to a combination of incompetence and the agricultural slump" at the end of the 19th century. His paternal grandfather, Plumer Cosby Walker, worked for the Great Northern Railway.

After three years in Malaysia, the family moved to Nairobi, Kenya, where his father was chief accountant of East African Railways. At age 13, Walker left Kenya to be educated at The King's School, Canterbury, followed by Trinity College, Oxford.

== Career ==
From 1956 to 1962, Walker served in the colonial administration in Uganda as part of the Foreign Service. He joined MI5 from the Ugandan Colonial Service in 1963.

Walker worked extensively in counter-terrorism. At the behest of Sir Maurice Oldfield (MI5) and incoming RUC Chief Constable John Hermon, in January 1980 he was asked to review the practices and organisation of intelligence gathering by the Royal Ulster Constabulary in Northern Ireland. Recommendations from the report were implemented via a memo issued in February 1981. The report established primacy of RUC Special Branch over all areas of intelligence gathering, and the Branch would also absorb weapons and firearms analysis. All intelligence contacts were to be offered to Special Branch, and all proposed arrests were to be cleared with the Branch. As a "basic rule" Criminal Investigation Department (CID) officers were not to discuss a Special Branch operation or investigation with other members of CID without express permission from the Branch. It is claimed by critics that the Walker Report cemented the position of RUC Special Branch as a force within a force, beyond normal checks and balances; established a policy of primacy of intelligence requirements over criminal investigation; led to a perception of informants as an untouchable "protected species"; and to an acceptance of cover-up and fabrication of evidence, such as that revealed after the so-called "shoot-to-kill" killings by police in 1982, that formed the subject of the Stalker inquiry. The implementing memo became known in 2001; the underlying report itself was declassified in June 2018.

Walker went on to be head of the counter-terrorism department. He was Director General of MI5 from January 1988 to February 1992. His term of office saw the statutory basis of MI5 established for the first time through the Security Service Act 1989 and the end of the Cold War. He was knighted in the 1990 Birthday Honours.

== Personal life ==
Walker, whose father was a Presbyterian and his mother an Anglican, was baptised in the Presbyterian Church of England in York at a few months old. He was confirmed as a member of the Church of England by Ven. Geoffrey Fisher, Archbishop of Canterbury, at 16 years old while attending school. He would convert to Roman Catholicism two years after marrying his wife, Susan Hastings, in April 1955, making him the first Roman Catholic to serve as DG of MI5. They had three children and nine grandchildren.

In 2009, Walker wrote an autobiography of his days in Africa, Towards Independence in Africa: A District Officer in Uganda at the End of Empire.

He died on 13 October 2021, at the age of 89.

== Bibliography ==
- Walker, Patrick (2009). Towards Independence in Africa: A District Officer in Uganda at the End of Empire. London: I. B. Tauris & Co. ISBN 978-1-84885-019-4.

Government offices
Preceded by Sir Anthony Duff	Director General of MI5; 1988–1992	Succeeded by Stella Rimington
