= Garden Suburb Theatre =

Amateur theatre companty in the United Kingdom, formed in 1908

- Garden Suburb Theatre logo
- Abbreviation: GST
- Formation: 1908
- Type: Amateur Theatre Company
- Region served: London
- Honorary President: Sir Donald Sinden
- Main organ: General Committee
- Affiliations: Member of NODA
- Website: www.gardensuburbtheatre.org.uk
- Formerly called: Theoric Committee; Play and Pageant Union; Speedwell Players; Hampstead Garden Suburb Dramatic Society (HGSDS)

The Garden Suburb Theatre is an amateur theatre company named after the Hampstead Garden Suburb, in which it originated.

== History ==
Amateur drama in the Hampstead Garden Suburb began as a series of annual Pageants starting in 1908. These were organised by the rather grandly titled Theoric Committee, which later renamed itself the Pageant Committee.

In 1920 the committee became the more general Play and Pageant Union (P&PU). In its foundational year, this group built the theatre in Little Oak Wood which is still used by the group every July. The group continued producing plays in many indoor venues as well as the outdoor theatre in Little Oak Wood. The main hall of the Henrietta Barnett School was developed as a workable theatre stage by the P&PU and was the indoor home to the group for most of the twentieth century. In recent years factors such as increasing rental from the school and a wider geographic catchment for the theatre group have meant that performances are at a variety of venues around North London.

The P&PU merged with the Speedwell Players (founded in 1929) to form the Hampstead Garden Suburb Dramatic Society in 1966. It was known under this name until 1992, when it switched to its present name.

=== Former members ===
With a history as far back as 1908, many former members have gone on to find fame, including

- Peter Mandelson, senior British politician.
- David McCallum, TV and film actor, best known for The Man from U.N.C.L.E. and the Invisible Man
- Michael Flanders, the lyricist and singer from the comedy duo Flanders and Swann
- Martin Furnival Jones, former head of MI5
- Tessa Peake-Jones, TV actor best known as playing Raquel Turner, girlfriend of Del-Boy Trotter in Only Fools and Horses
- Tom Ross-Williams, actor best known as Tennessee Williams in Vieux Carre (2012)

== Current ==
The Garden Suburb Theatre is a thriving and welcoming community-based theatre group with a brief of providing the local community with greater understanding of the dramatic arts. It fulfils this brief through a programme of pieces chosen as much for their dramatic interest as their box-office draw, and by encouraging active participation from locals, whatever their age or level of experience.

The most recent Honorary President of the society was Sir Donald Sinden until his death in 2014.
