= Director General of MI5 =

Head of the UK's Security Service

Director General of the Security Service (MI5)
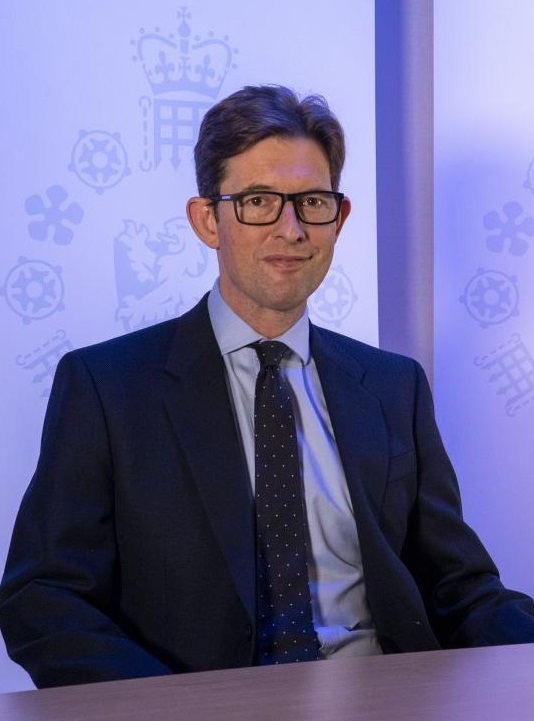
- Incumbent; Ken McCallum since 30 March 2020; 6 years ago
- Security Service (MI5)
- Residence: Thames House, London, UK
- Appointer: Home Secretary
- Term length: No fixed term
- Inaugural holder: Vernon Kell; 1909
- Formation: Security Service Act 1989
- Website: https://www.mi5.gov.uk/

The Director General of the Security Service is the head of the Security Service (commonly known as MI5), the United Kingdom's internal counter-intelligence and security agency. The director general is assisted by a deputy director general and an assistant director general, and reports to the home secretary, although the Security Service is not formally part of the Home Office.

== List of directors general ==
Directors General have been:

1. Maj Gen Sir Vernon Kell, 1909–1940
2. Brigadier 'Jasper' Harker, Acting, June 1940 – April 1941
3. Sir David Petrie, 1941–1946
4. Sir Percy Sillitoe, 1946–1953
5. Sir Dick White, 1953–1956
6. Sir Roger Hollis, 1956–1965
7. Sir Martin Furnival Jones, 1965–1972
8. Sir Michael Hanley, 1972–1978
9. Sir Howard Smith, 1978–1981
10. Sir John Jones, 1981–1985
11. Sir Antony Duff, 1985–1988
12. Sir Patrick Walker, 1988–1992
13. Dame Stella Rimington, 1992–1996
14. Sir Stephen Lander, 1996–2002
15. Dame Eliza Manningham-Buller, 2002–2007
16. Sir Jonathan Evans, 2007–2013
17. Sir Andrew Parker, 2013–2020
18. Sir Ken McCallum, from 2020

== See also ==
- Chief of the Secret Intelligence Service
- Director of the Government Communications Headquarters
