= Ken McCallum =

British intelligence officer (born 1974)

Sir Ken McCallum KCB
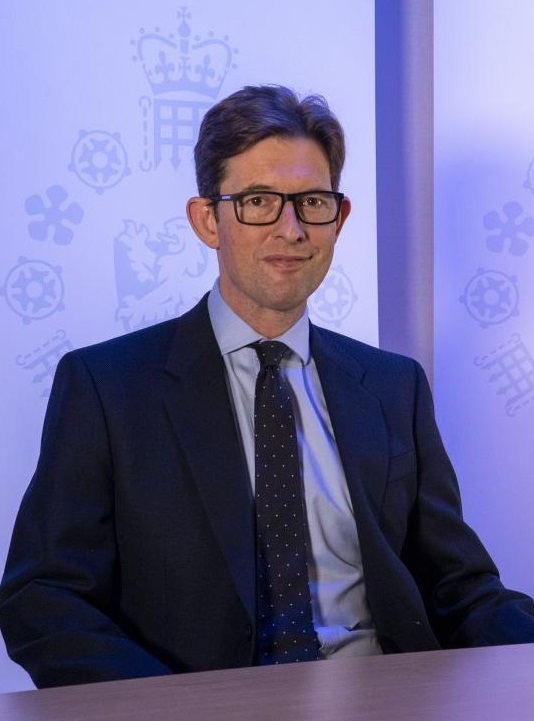
- McCallum in 2020

Director General of MI5
- Incumbent
- Assumed office April 2020
- Home Secretary: Priti Patel; Suella Braverman; Grant Shapps; James Cleverly; Yvette Cooper; Shabana Mahmood
- Preceded by: Sir Andrew Parker

Personal details
- Born: Kenneth Douglas McCallum; 1974 (age 51–52) Glasgow, Scotland
- Education: University of Glasgow
- Occupation: Intelligence officer

Sir Kenneth Douglas McCallum (born 1974) is a British intelligence officer who has been serving as the director general of MI5 since 2020.

== Early life and education ==
McCallum grew up in Broomhill in the West End of Glasgow. He went to a state school. In 1996, he took a first in maths and computing from the University of Glasgow.

== Career ==
McCallum has been an intelligence officer at MI5 for over two decades, including service focused on Northern Ireland-related terrorism and leading counter-terrorism investigations during the London 2012 Olympic Games. He was appointed Deputy Director General of MI5 in April 2017.

He said of his early career: "I spent my twenties mostly trying to recruit terrorists inside terrorist organisations to work as secret agents [to keep] the rest of us safe."

In 2018, McCallum took charge of the MI5 response to the attempted assassination of Sergei Skripal.

=== Director General of MI5 ===
In April 2020, McCallum succeeded Sir Andrew Parker as Director General of MI5.

In 2021, McCallum said in his annual threat update that the activities of China, Russia, and other hostile states could have as large an impact on the public as terrorism, marking a significant shift in emphasis for the UK's domestic spy agency. McCallum said that the British public will have to "build the same public awareness and resilience to state threats that we have done over the years on terrorism".

At a joint press conference with Christopher A. Wray in July 2022, McCallum said that MI5 had "more than doubled" its effort against Chinese activity over the same timeframe as part of an unprecedented joint warning with his counterpart at the FBI. He added the "most game-changing challenge" MI5 faced came from an "increasingly authoritarian Chinese Communist party".

In November 2022, McCallum said there had been at least 10 potential threats by Iran to kidnap or kill British or UK-based people in 2022. McCallum also warned that the UK "must be ready for Russian aggression for years to come".

In 2023, he noted the increased risks to the UK during the Israel–Gaza war. "One of the things that concerns me most right now, is to understand quite what the shape of the UK impact will be", McCallum said in an interview. He also warned there was a risk that events in the Middle East could radicalise people towards violence.

In October 2023 McCallum stated that more than 20,000 people in the UK were approached covertly online by Chinese spies. It comes amid a new warning to tens of thousands of British businesses of the risk of having their innovation stolen. He stated, "We have seen a sustained campaign on a pretty epic scale", McCallum told the BBC in an interview.

In a 2024 speech, he stated that Russia's intelligence agency has been on a mission to generate "mayhem on British and European streets". He warned the UK faces the most "complex and interconnected" threat it has ever seen. He added there had been 20 Iran-backed plots since 2022.

In a December 2024 podcast interview with Simon Case, McCallum stated that MI5 has had to "pare back" its counter-terrorism focus due to the growing threat from Russia and other hostile states. Highlighting finite resources, he stated, "we had the 20- to 30-year holiday from that kind of big player, sophisticated states in serious conflict with each other. It's back, I'm afraid". In the same podcast, McCallum spoke about the adjustment needed as the public head of MI5, "Having spent all of my career being the world's most boring neighbour at barbecues, on the street, and being as deflective and uninteresting as you can possibly be, [it is] quite odd to then be on the telly. Even some members of my own extended family were completely shocked", he says.

McCallum was appointed a Knight Commander of the Order of the Bath (KCB) in the 2025 New Year Honours.

On 15 October 2025, after the collapse of a case concerning allegations of Chinese spying, McCallum stated MI5 had intervened operationally to disrupt Chinese activity of national security concern in the past week. McCallum said that it was "frustrating when prosecutions fall through".

In a 2026 speech, McCallum warned about threats from foreign powers which he said has quadrupled in the last ten years, with Russia as the primary source of this. In addition he cited Iran backed aggression. He warned of the dangers of AI and threats stemming from "extreme right-wing terrorism".

Government offices
Preceded by Sir Andrew Parker	Director General of MI5; 2020–present	Incumbent
