= List of public art in Millbank =

This is a list of public art in Millbank, a district in the City of Westminster, London.

Millbank is the location of Tate Britain and the Chelsea College of Arts; the latter institution's Rootstein Hopkins Parade Ground is a large temporary exhibition space for the work of students and established artists.

Image	Title / subject	Location and coordinates	Date	Artist / designer	Architect / other	Type	Designation	Notes
More images	The Rescue of Andromeda	Outside Tate Britain 51°29′27″N 0°07′37″W	1893	Henry Charles Fehr	—N/a	Sculptural group	Grade II* (with building)	A plaster model was exhibited in the Royal Academy in 1893 and cast in bronze, probably at the recommendation of Frederic, Lord Leighton. This was bought for the Tate the following year under the terms of the Chantrey Bequest. Initially displayed inside the gallery, it was moved to its present site in 1911, where the sculptor felt it was "swamped by heavy masonry".
More images	Statue of John Everett Millais	John Islip Street, rear of Tate Britain 51°29′28″N 0°07′44″W	1904	Thomas Brock	—N/a	Statue	Grade II	Originally stood by the entrance of the gallery. By 1961 Norman Reid, the Tate's director, considered the statue to have a "positively harmful" effect, and he attempted have it replaced by Rodin's John the Baptist. In 2000 the statue was moved to the rear of the building after ownership was transferred from English Heritage to the Tate.
More images	The Death of Dirce	Outside Tate Britain 51°29′27″N 0°07′37″W	1906	Charles Bennett Lawes-Wittewronge	—N/a	Sculptural group	Grade II* (with building)	Based on the Farnese Bull, a classical sculpture depicting the same subject. Presented to the Tate by the sculptor's widow in 1911. A second, larger version in marble is in the grounds of Rothamsted Manor, the sculptor's family estate in Hertfordshire.
	Saint George	Thames House	1928	Charles Sargeant Jagger	Frank Baines	Architectural sculpture	Grade II	
	Britannia	Thames House	1928	Charles Sargeant Jagger	Frank Baines	Architectural sculpture	Grade II	
	Marine Transport	Imperial Chemical House	1928	Charles Sargeant Jagger	Frank Baines	Architectural sculpture	Grade II	
	The Sower	Imperial Chemical House	1928	Charles Sargeant Jagger	Frank Baines	Architectural sculpture	Grade II	
	Chemistry	Imperial Chemical House	1928	Charles Sargeant Jagger	Frank Baines	Architectural sculpture	Grade II	
	The Builder	Imperial Chemical House	1928	Charles Sargeant Jagger	Frank Baines	Architectural sculpture	Grade II	
More images	Two Piece Reclining Figure No. 1	McGregor Courtyard, Chelsea College of Arts, Atterbury Road 51°29′25″N 0°07′39″W	1959	Henry Moore	—N/a	Sculpture	Grade II	Originally installed at the Chelsea School of Art's newly built Manresa Road campus in 1964, Moore's sculpture took up residence at the college's current location in 2010.
More images	Locking Piece	Riverside Walk Gardens 51°29′21″N 0°07′40″W	1963–1964	Henry Moore	—N/a	Sculpture	—N/a	Unveiled 19 July 1968. Moore had never been satisfied with the setting of the piece on a multi-faceted plinth by a fountain; these features were removed and the gardens re-landscaped in 2003.
More images	Jeté	Millbank, south of Tate Britain 51°29′23″N 0°07′40″W	1975	Enzo Plazzotta	—N/a	Statue	—N/a	Unveiled 16 July 1985. Represents the dancer David Wall making his entrance in the ballet La Bayadère.
	Glass canopy	Chapter House, Chapter Street 51°29′28″N 0°08′02″W	2004	Kate Maestri with Andrew Moor Associates	—N/a	Glass canopy	—N/a	
More images	Big 4	Channel 4 headquarters, Horseferry Road 51°29′45″N 0°07′58″W	2007	Freestate and Atelier One	—N/a	Sculpture	—N/a	Unveiled 16 October 2007, for Channel 4's 25th anniversary. The separate elements of the sculpture when seen from the right angle form the number 4, in the manner of the channel's idents. The bare steel structure was designed to be adapted by artists who would create their own "skins", thus constantly renewing the work.
	Relief	Peel House, 105 Regency Street	2009	Stuart Bamford Smith	Darling Associates	Relief	—N/a	A scene of a "peeler" stopping a runaway carriage, with details based on Francis Frith photographs; the building formerly housed the Metropolitan Police's training school.
	Search for Enlightenment	Riverside Walk Gardens 51°29′21″N 0°07′41″W	2011	Simon Gudgeon	—N/a	Sculptures	—N/a	Unveiled 9 October 2011. Two large, bronze heads in profile, shallow and hollowed-out with their faces upturned to the sky. The sculptor wished to comment on "the narrowness of consciousness, the vastness of time and the transience of humanity". (See also another cast in Kinghtsbridge.)
	Tree sculpture	The Courthouse, Horseferry Road 51°29′43″N 0°07′43″W	2014	Tom Price	Biotecture	Sculpture	—N/a	
More images	Shapes in the Clouds II	Riverside Walk 51°29′19″N 0°07′43″W	2014	Peter Randall-Page	—N/a	Sculpture	—N/a	
More images	We Watch You Too	Riverwalk 51°29′20″N 0°07′41″W	2016	Pablo Reinoso	—N/a	Sculptural bench	—N/a	Located directly across the river from the SIS Building
More images	Only Children's Bench	Riverwalk 51°29′19″N 0°07′42″W	2016	Pablo Reinoso	—N/a	Sculptural bench	—N/a	
More images	Statue of Ada Lovelace	7 Millbank, at the junction of Horseferry Road and Dean Bradley Street	2022	Mary and Etienne Millner	Dallas-Pierce-Quintero	Architectural sculpture	—N/a	The bronze statue, set up high on the façade, is flanked by representations of concertinaed punched cards. Another version was installed in 2026 in Hinckley, Leicestershire, near Lovelace's childhood home of Kirkby Mallory Hall.

== Bibliography ==
- Ward-Jackson, Philip (2011). Public Sculpture of Historic Westminster: Volume 1. Public Sculpture of Britain. Vol. 14. Liverpool: Liverpool University Press. ISBN 978-1-84631-691-3.
