= Westminster House, London =

Office block in London, England

Coordinates: 51.496238°N 0.125902°W

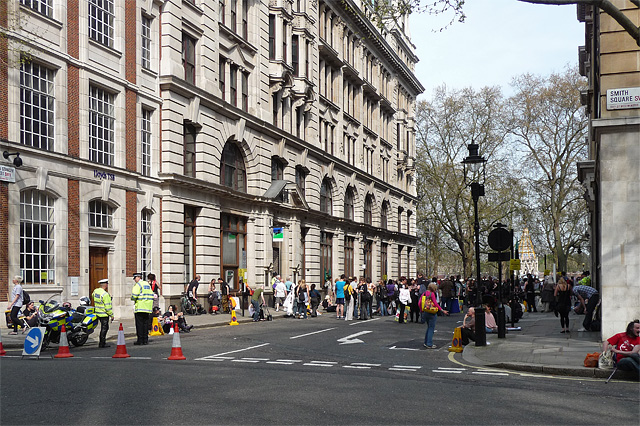
View of Dean Stanley Street, Westminster House on left.

Westminster House or 7 Millbank is an office block in Millbank, London.

Originally built as offices for the British American Tobacco Company. The building was designed by Gunton & Gunton with construction beginning in 1913 and completing in 1915. The design is Edwardian, utilising steel frame construction. The building was extended in a slightly different style onto Smith Square in 1929.

Skanska was given permission to redevelop the building in 2024, although under the condition of retaining its facade. The building's neighbour, 4 Millbank, home to a number of television studios saw its tenants, including the BBC and ITV, object to the construction on the grounds of excess noise.

== See also ==
- Millbank House
- 4 Millbank
- Imperial Chemical House
- Thames House
