= Millbank House =

Office building in London, England

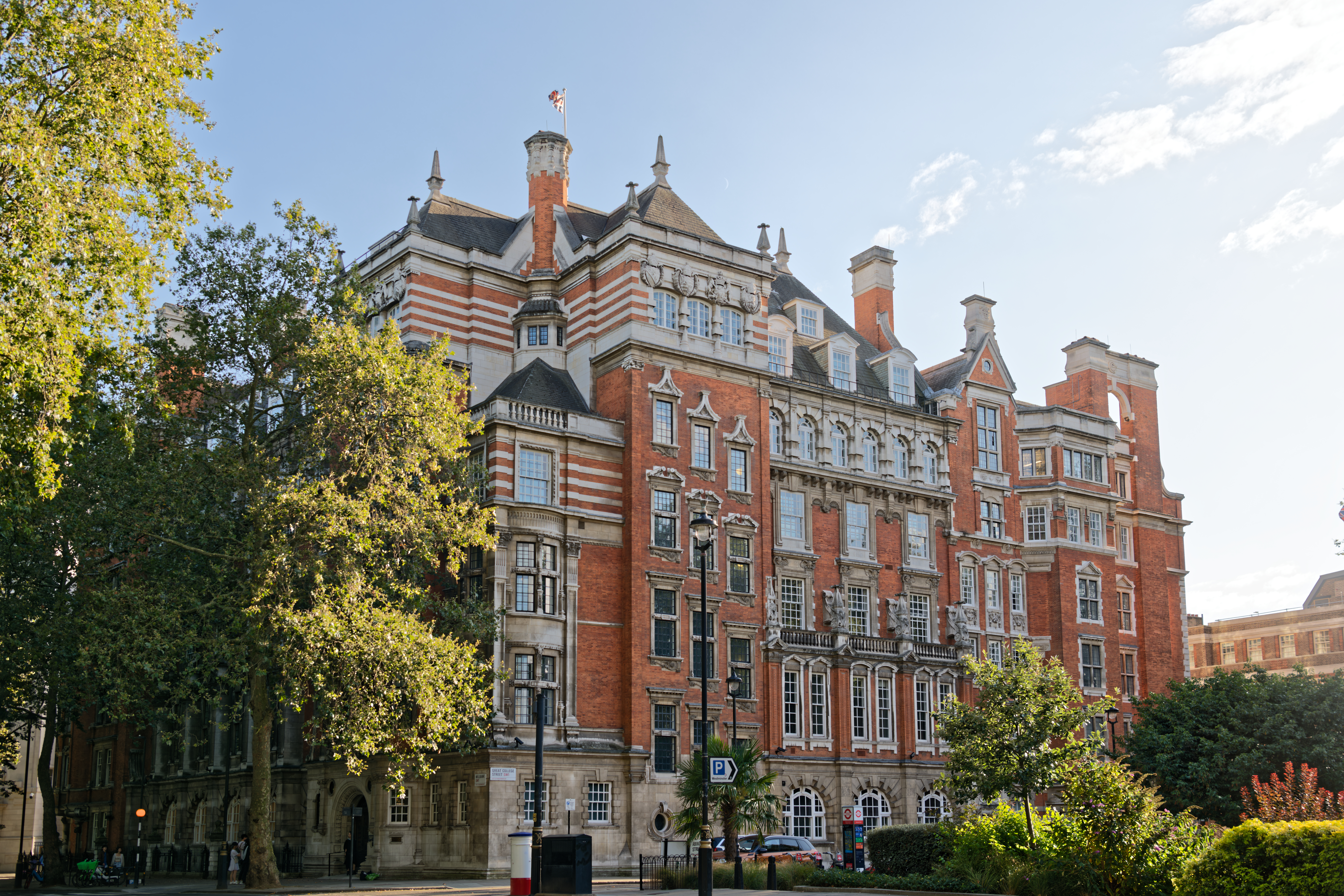
- Millbank House

General information
- Type: Office
- Architectural style: Edwardian, Eclecticism
- Location: London, England
- Coordinates: 51°29′50″N 0°07′34″W
- Completed: 1906

Design and construction
- Architect: W. D. Caröe

Listed Building – Grade II*
- Official name: 1 and 2 Millbank, The Church Commissioners (including No 3 Great College Street, No 2 Great Peter Street and Nos 5 and 7 Little College Street)
- Designated: 05 February 1970
- Reference no.: 1267603

Millbank House at addresses and originally known as No. 1 and 2 Millbank is a Grade II* listed office building located to the south of College Green in the Westminster area of London.

== Background ==
Millbank House is located along Millbank, historically an area known for Millbank Prison and the lack of firm ground for building, with flooding frequent. It was first developed by Thomas Cubitt alongside Pimlico, with houses first built along the river in the 1820s. Despite development, the area remained undesirable, described in Dickens' David Copperfield as "a melancholy waste". The character of the area is largely changed today owing to a number of edwardian office along the river which replaced the older houses. Millbank House, lying to the north and therefore the more historically developed area, is one of many such blocks. Following south along Millbank are also Great Peter House, Westminster House, Imperial Chemical House and Thames House.

Millbank House was originally designed by W. D. Caröe as a headquarters for the Church Commissioners. The buildings would maintain its original role headquarters until its sale by the Commissioners, followed by the latter moving to Church House in 2007.

== Design ==
Millbank house is notable for its freestyle of eclectic architecture, an asymmetrical mix of renaissance styles in red brick and Portland stone dressings. The building is adorned with decorative motifs, chimney-stacks, scrolls, and oriels. The building makes use of steel framing to achieve its design.
