= 1928 Thames flood =

Combined storm surge and river flood of the River Thames

Coordinates: 51.484°N 0.162°W

1928 Thames Flood
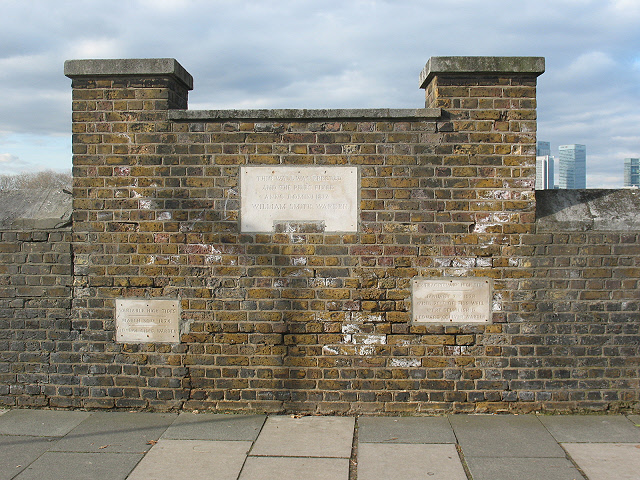
- Thames flood level markers at Trinity Hospital, Greenwich. The marker on the right is for 1928

Meteorological history
- Formed: 6 to 7 January 1928

Overall effects
- Fatalities: 14
- Areas affected: London (City, Southwark, Lambeth, Westminster, Hammersmith, Putney, Greenwich, Woolwich)

The 1928 Thames flood was a disastrous flood of the River Thames that affected much of riverside London on 7 January 1928, as well as places further downriver. Fourteen people died and thousands were made homeless when floodwaters poured over the top of the Thames Embankment and part of the Chelsea Embankment collapsed. It was the last major flood to affect central London, and, along with the disastrous North Sea flood of 1953, helped lead to the implementation of new flood control measures that culminated in the construction of the Thames Barrier in the 1970s.

== Causes of the flood ==
During Christmas 1927, heavy snow fell in the Cotswolds in west-central England, where the Thames has its source. A sudden thaw occurred over New Year's Eve, followed by unusually heavy rain, doubling the volume of water coming down the river. The sudden rise in water level coincided with a high spring tide and a storm surge caused by a major extra-tropical cyclone in the North Sea. The storm surge raised the water levels in the Thames Estuary, measured at Southend, to 1.5 metres (4.9 feet) above normal.

The funnelling of the water further up the river caused its level to rise even higher. The situation was worsened by capital dredging that had been carried out between 1909 and 1928, deepening the river channel by about 2 metres (6.6 feet) to allow access for deeper-draughted vessels to the Port of London. This had the side effect of making it easier for seawater to flow up the Thames on a high tide, increasing the flow on a mean tide by about 4% and raising the tidal range by about 0.7 metres (2.3 feet).

This produced the highest water levels ever recorded in the Thames in London. The flood peaked at about 1:30 am on 7 January when a level of 5.55 metres (18 feet 3 inches) above the datum line was recorded, nearly a foot higher than the previous record. Extensive flooding resulted as the river overflowed the Embankments from the City of London and Southwark up to Putney and Hammersmith. Serious flooding was also reported in Greenwich, Woolwich and other locations further downriver, causing major property damage.

== Consequences ==
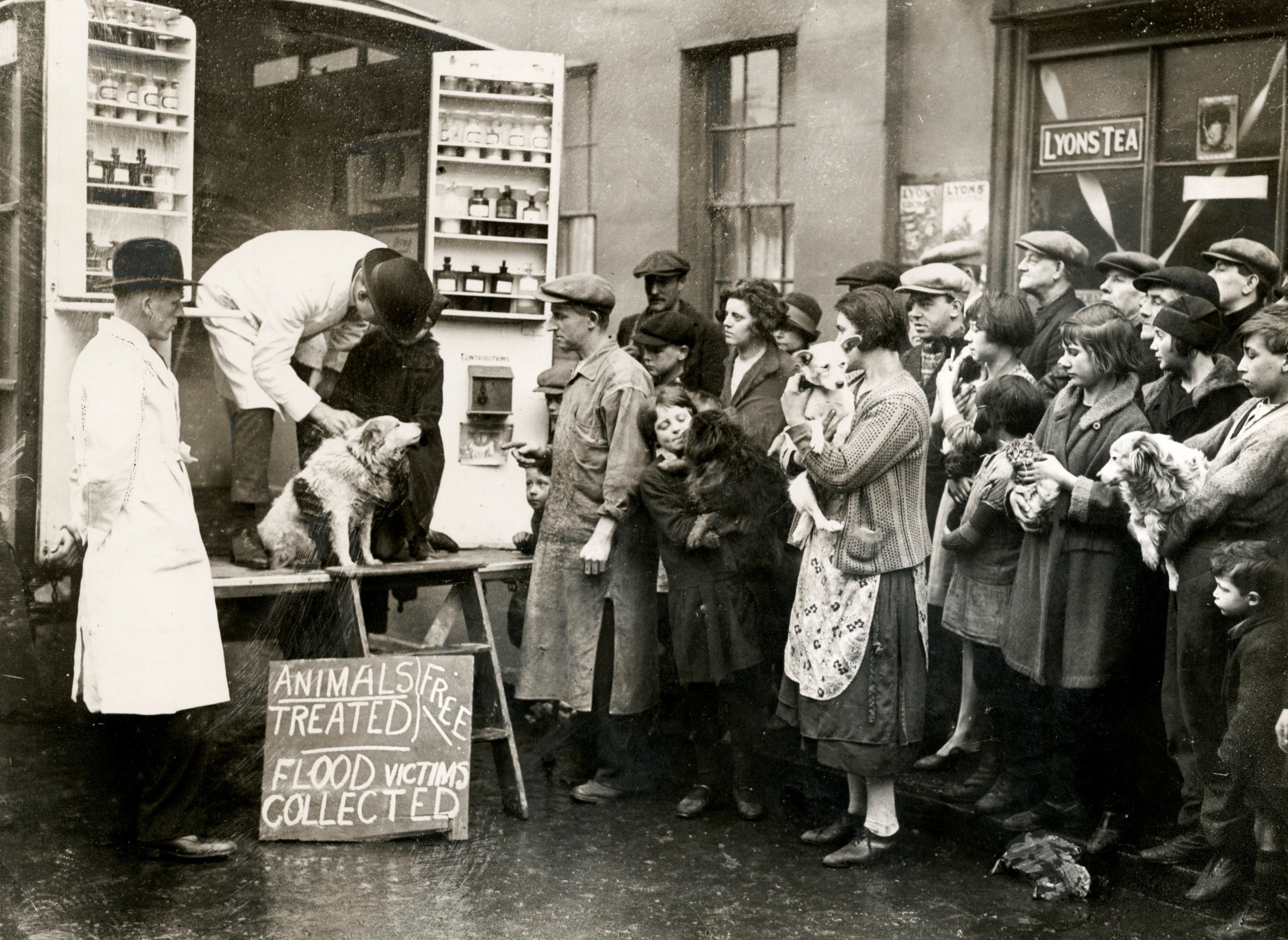
Mobile animal hospital for pets that have suffered from the flood

The damage caused by the flood took several years to repair. Millbank, the most seriously affected area, was largely rebuilt from scratch; many of the run-down dwellings and warehouses that had characterised the area were so badly damaged that they had to be demolished, while the rest were torn down as part of the area's post-flood regeneration. They were replaced with modern office blocks and apartment buildings. Imperial Chemical House (designed by Sir Frank Baines, the Principal Architect of the Government's Office of Works) was one of the new buildings constructed in the area in 1927–29. The current headquarters of MI5, Thames House, was built to a very similar (though not identical) design in 1929–1930 on the other side of Horseferry Road, with the two buildings forming a landmark pair of office blocks facing the river.

A new Lambeth Bridge was constructed to replace its dilapidated predecessor, and Horseferry Road was widened to afford access to the bridge. The height of the Embankments was raised and the river wall was strengthened along substantial parts of the river. Proposals were made for the construction of a Thames flood barrier, but these came to nothing, due to concerns that such a barrier would impede shipping access to the London docks.

The flood of January 1928 was the last major flood in the city centre, although the North Sea flood of 1953 came within millimetres of overtopping the Embankment, and did flood Bermondsey and some other low-lying parts of the city. Another flood affected the lower Thames in 1959. In response to the threat of such floods happening again, plans were made in the mid-1960s to build a flood barrier on the Thames to guard against the threat of storm surges. By then, much of London's shipping had moved to Tilbury Docks further downriver, greatly reducing the navigational difficulties that a barrier would present. The Thames Barrier project finally got under way in 1974 and the completed barrier was officially opened in 1984.

=== Damage resulting from the flood ===
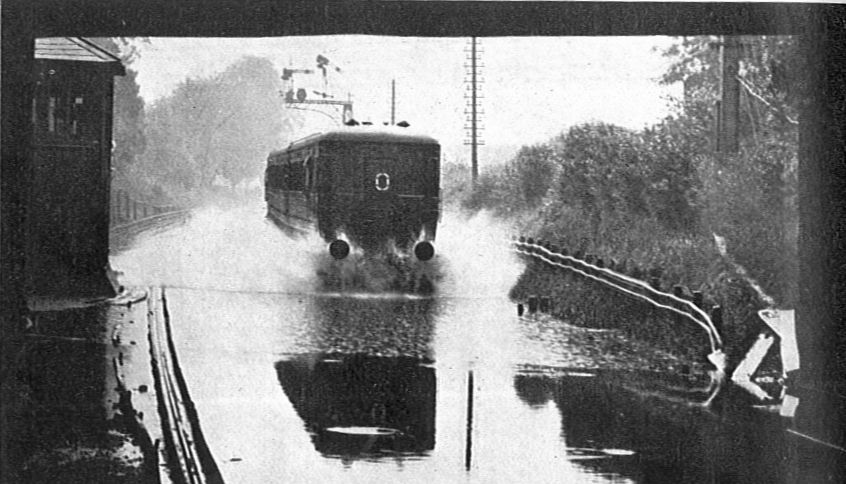
A Southern Railway electric multiple unit tackles floods at Kew Bridge railway station.

A considerable area of the city centre was flooded by this unprecedented combination of events. The first section of the riverbank to give way was opposite the Tate Gallery at Millbank, where a 75-foot (23 m) section of the Chelsea Embankment collapsed. The gallery was flooded almost to the tops of the doors on the ground floor (a depth of between five and eight feet 1.5 to 2.4 m), which caused damage to many paintings in the gallery's collections, most notably those of J. M. W. Turner. Near Lambeth Bridge the embankment gave way, sending a wall of water through a generally poor and run-down area; there, nine people drowned (and one died of a heart attack brought on by shock) in their basement apartments, unable to escape from where they were living. Another two people died in Hammersmith, and two more in Fulham. Another 4,000 Londoners were made homeless as water filled the streets to a depth of four feet (1.2 m).

Westminster Hall and the House of Commons were also flooded, as were the London Underground stations and lines along the riverside. The moat at the Tower of London, which had been empty for over 80 years, was refilled by the river, and the Blackwall and Rotherhithe Tunnels were submerged. Other buildings that flooded were Lots Road Power Station and Wandsworth Gas Works.

The Manchester Guardian described the scene on the morning of 7 January:

Remarkable scenes were witnessed all along the Embankment. At the Houses of Parliament the water "cataracted" over the parapet into the open space at the foot of Big Ben. The floods penetrated into Old Palace Yard, which shortly after one o'clock was about a foot under water in parts.

Flooding was worst at Charing Cross and Waterloo bridges, where the river sweeps round. Water poured over the Embankment, and the road was covered in a depth of several inches.

At intervals along the Embankment stood tramcars derelict and deserted. Later attempts were made to tow them through the floods by means of motor-lorries. Taxicabs and motor-cars splashed along the far side of the road. The public subway, Westminster Bridge, was flooded to a depth of four feet. There were miniature waterfalls at Cleopatra's Needle and the Royal Air Force Memorial, and the training ship President floated at street level.

The flood was short-lived, and the waters subsided by the end of the day. However, it took considerably longer to drain the many roads, tunnels, basements and cellars that had been flooded.
