= 4 Millbank =

Office building in London

Coordinates: 51.496691°N 0.125976°W

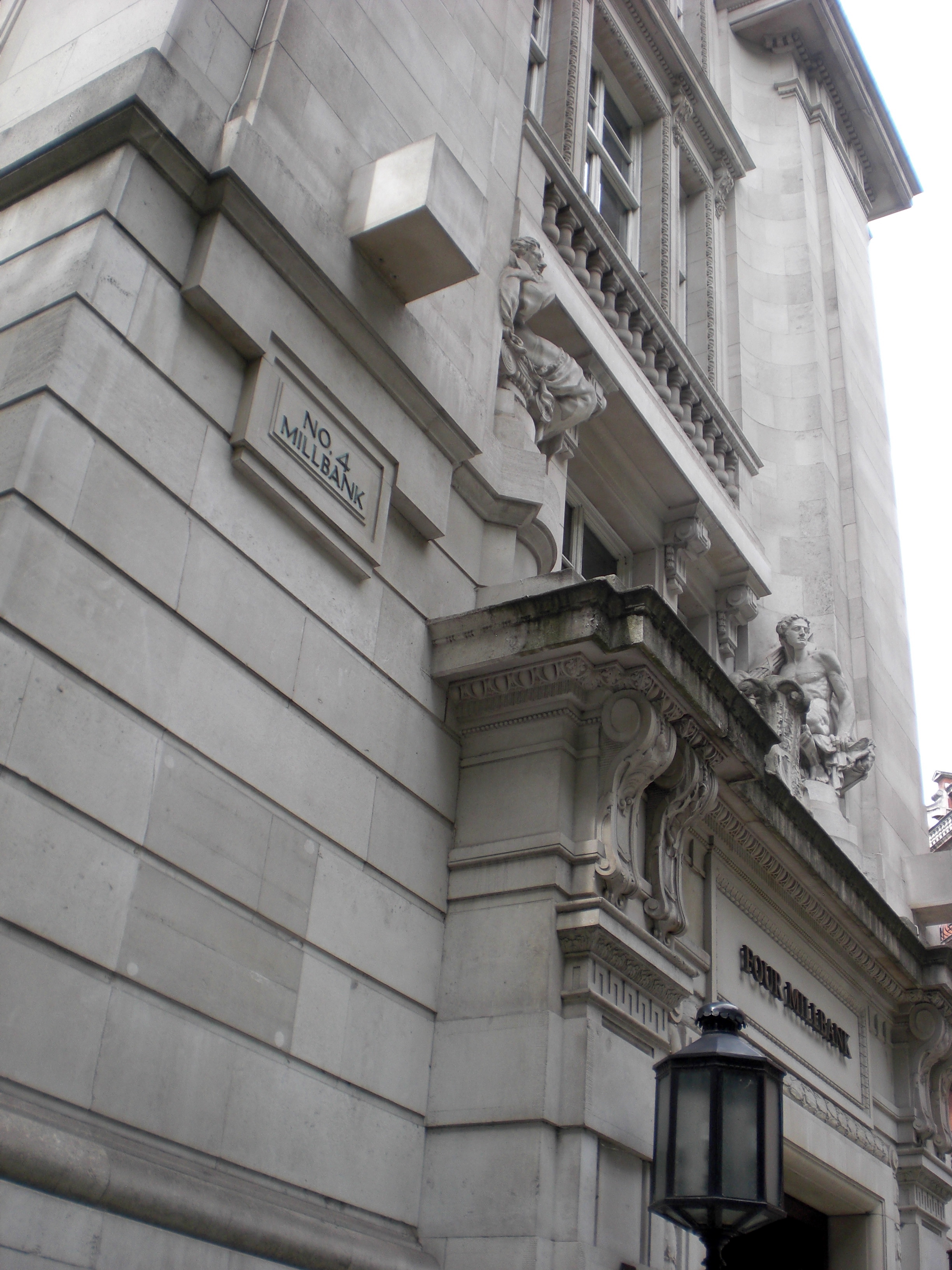
Northeast corner of 4 Millbank

4 Millbank or Great Peter House is an office block in Millbank, London, originally built as a headquarters for the Crown Agents for the Colonies.

The offices were built between 1912 and 1916 by architects John William Simpson and Maxwell Ayrton for the Crown Agents. A northwest extension was added in 1920. Despite being designed outside the reign of Edward VII it retains an Edwardian style, rather than the more popular Arts and Crafts designs of the period.

Omrania carried out a redevelopment of the site between 1989-1991 while retaining its original facade. Following the work, it became popular with television stations, hosting studios for the BBC and ITV.

== See also ==
- Millbank House
- Westminster House
- Imperial Chemical House
- Thames House
