= Frank Baines =

Frank Baines may refer to:

- Frank Baines (architect), architect
- Frank Baines (gymnast), Scottish gymnast
