= John Islip Street =

Street in Central London

Coordinates: 51.491875°N 0.128396°W

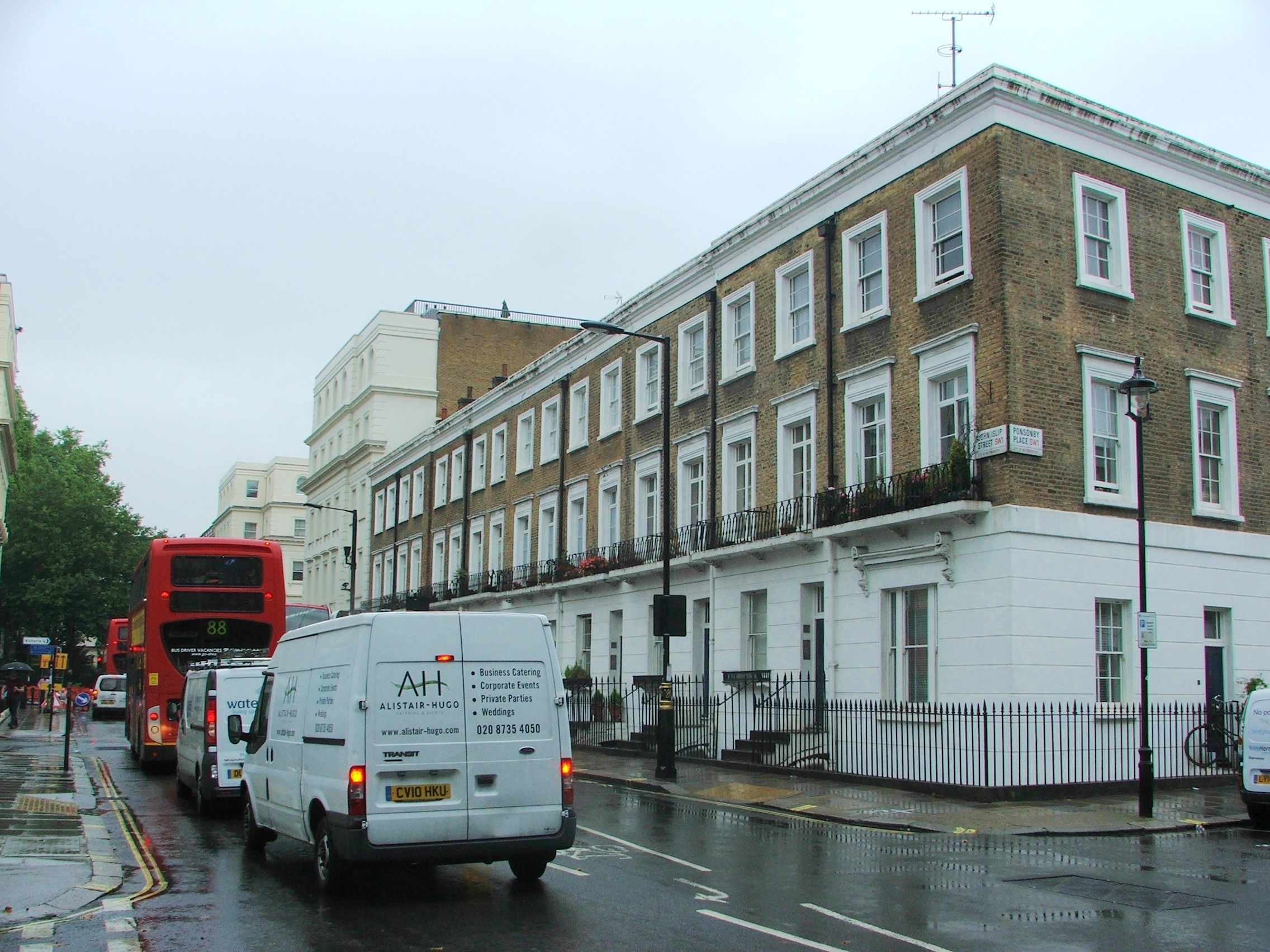
Early Victorian era buildings at southern end of street

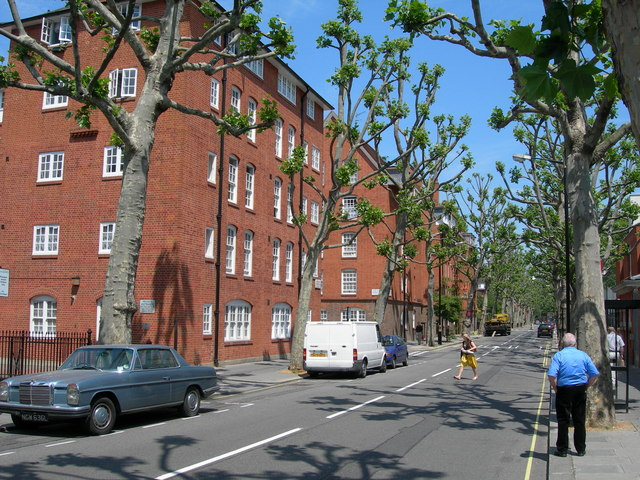
Looking northwards from the junction with Ponsonby Place. Several of the red-brick buildings of the LCC's Millbank Estate are on the left

John Islip Street is a road in Pimlico in Central London. Located in the City of Westminster, it runs roughly northeastwards from Vauxhall Bridge Road. It is close to the River Thames with the Millbank riverfront running parallel to it. It forms part of the B326 road. Streets running off it include Page Street, Marsham Street, Ponsonby Place and Atterbury Street.

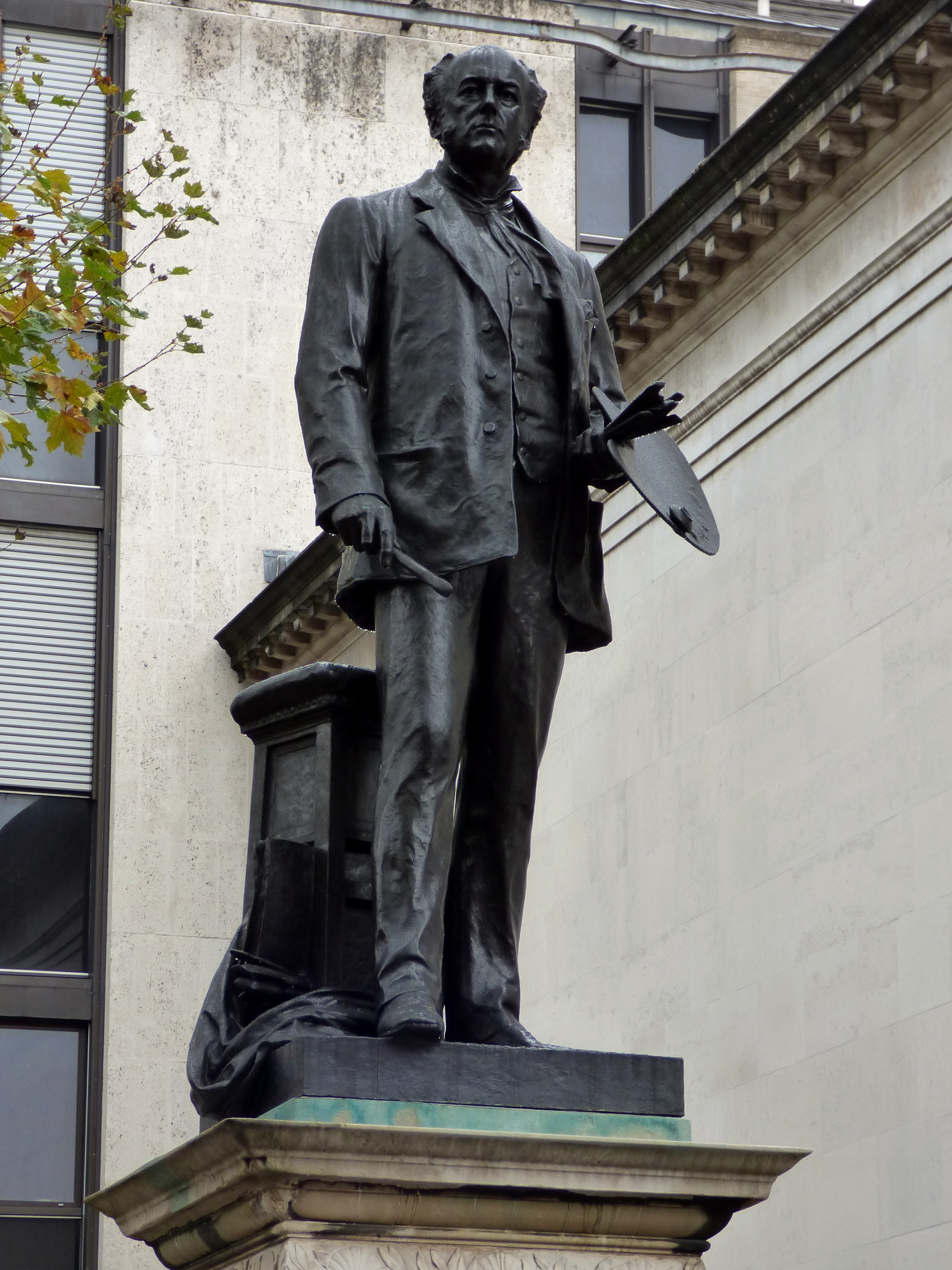
Statue of John Everett Millais outside the Tate Britain

The street is named after John Islip, an abbot of Westminster Abbey during the Tudor era. On one side of the street is the Tate Britain, one of the leading art galleries in the city. Constructed in 1897, it was bombed during the Second World War. A statue of John Everett Millais designed by Thomas Brock was erected outside the Tate in 1904 and is now Grade II listed. Adjacent to the Tate is the former Queen Alexandra Military Hospital which opened in 1905.

Across the road are a number of redbrick tenement buildings that form the Millbank Estate. Built by the London County Council from 1897 to 1902. In reference to nearby Tate Gallery they are named after celebrated British artists of the nineteenth century including Landseer, Lawrence, Leighton, Millais and Wilkie. They were built partly with materials reused from the demolished Millbank Prison that had existed since 1816. A number of buildings are now listed.

== Bibliography ==
- Bebbington, Gillian. London Street Names. Batsford, 1972.
- Pevsner, Nikolaus. London: The cities of London and Westminster. Penguin, 1973.
