= Marsham Street =

London street

Coordinates: 51°29′45″N 0°07′45″W

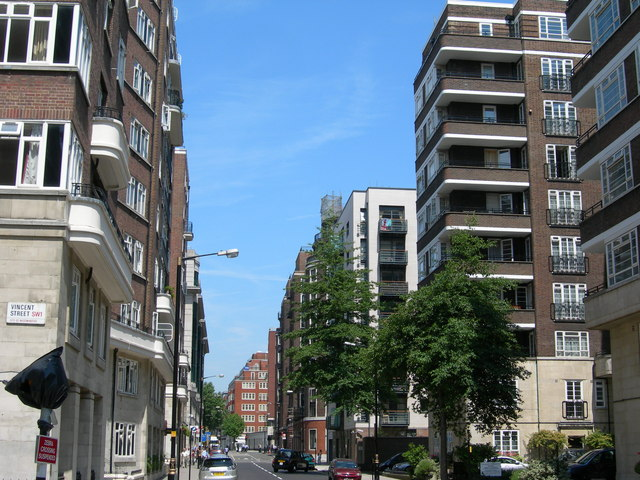
Marsham Street (SW1) (June 2006)

Marsham Street is a street in the City of Westminster in London, England. It is approximately one mile in length and runs south from Great Peter Street near Victoria Street and Parliament Square.

== Description ==
Marsham Street bisects Horseferry Road and runs from the Tate Foundation on John Islip Street to Great Smith Street. Like many streets in the area, it has long been the location for offices of the Government of the United Kingdom, and is currently home to the Home Office, the Department for Transport and the Ministry of Housing, Communities and Local Government.

Along with Great Smith Street to the north and John Islip Street to the south, it is designated the B326 in the Great Britain Road Numbering Scheme.

Romney House (47 Marsham Street) was built in the 1930s by the Austro British architect Michael Rosenauer. The large red brick church (9–23 Marsham Street) was designed by Sir Herbert Baker and A. T. Scott in 1928 for Christian Scientists. In the 1990s, it became the Emmanuel Centre (a conference centre) and the Emmanuel Evangelical Church.

Marsham Street has been subject to a number of high-end residential developments formed out of what used to be Westminster Hospital and associated former nursing accommodation. These developments were completed between 2005 and 2007.
