= Lambeth Bridge =

Grade II listed road bridge in London, United Kingdom

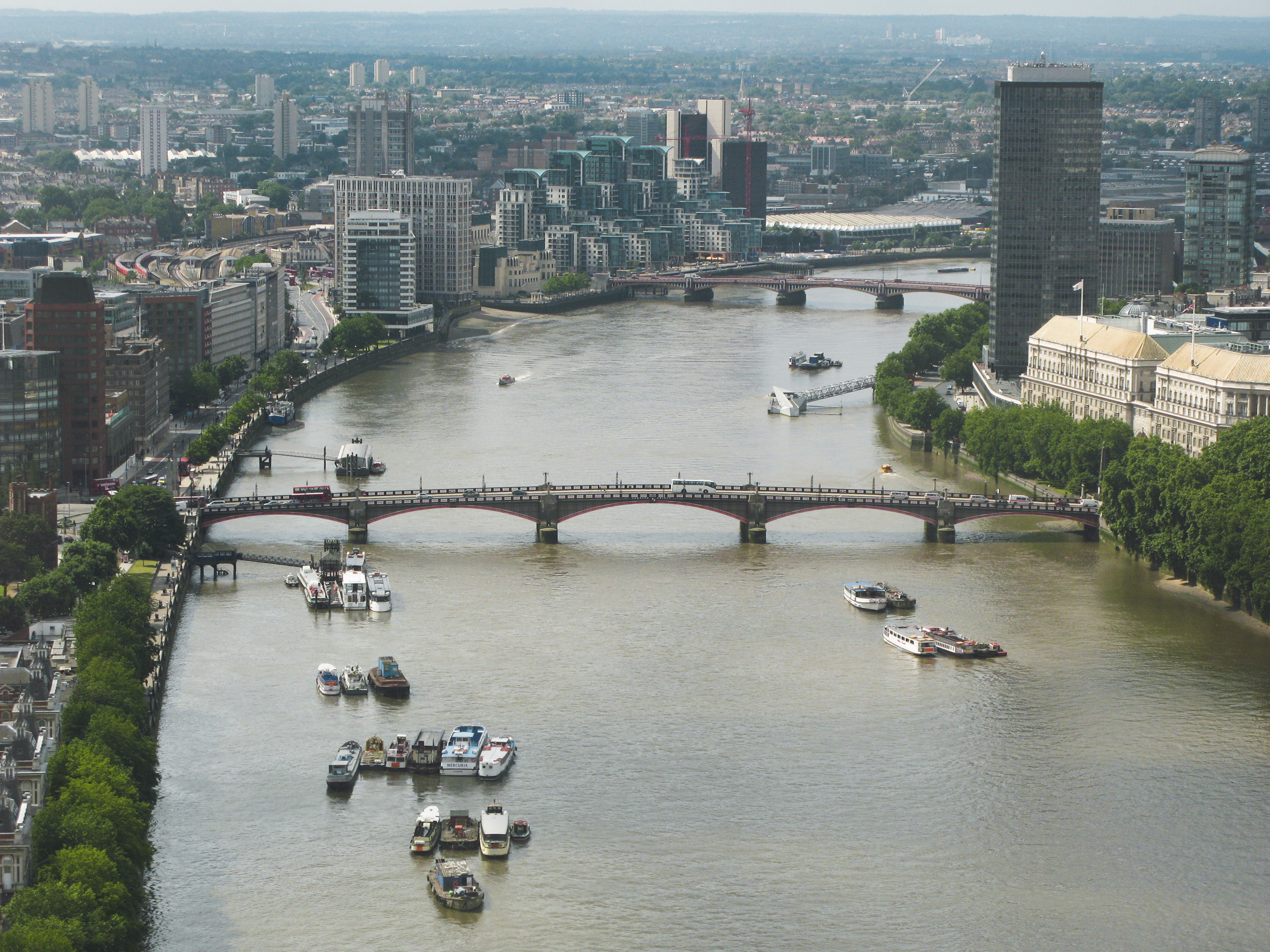
- River Thames; Lambeth Bridge with Vauxhall Bridge in the distance (as seen from London Eye)
- Coordinates: 51°29′40″N 0°07′23″W
- Carries: Lambeth Road
- Crosses: River Thames
- Locale: London
- Maintained by: Transport for London
- Preceded by: Vauxhall Bridge
- Followed by: Westminster Bridge

Characteristics
- Design: Arch

History
- Opened: (first bridge) 10 November 1862; 163 years ago (second bridge) 19 July 1932; 94 years ago

Location
- Interactive map of Lambeth Bridge

Lambeth Bridge is a road traffic and footbridge crossing the River Thames in an east–west direction in central London. The river flows north at the crossing point. Downstream, the next bridge is Westminster Bridge; upstream, the next bridge is Vauxhall Bridge.

The most conspicuous colour in the bridge's paint scheme is red, the same colour as the leather benches in the House of Lords, which is at the southern end of the Palace of Westminster nearest the bridge. This is in contrast to Westminster Bridge, which is predominantly green, the same colour as the benches in the House of Commons at the northern end of the Houses of Parliament.

On the east side, in Lambeth, are Lambeth Palace, the Albert Embankment, St. Thomas' Hospital, and the International Maritime Organization. On the west side, in Westminster, are Thames House (the headquarters of MI5), behind which is Horseferry House (the National Probation Service headquarters), and Clelland House and Abell House (the headquarters of HM Prison Service), and the Millbank Tower and Tate Britain. The Palace of Westminster is a short walk downstream to the north through the Victoria Tower Garden.

== History ==
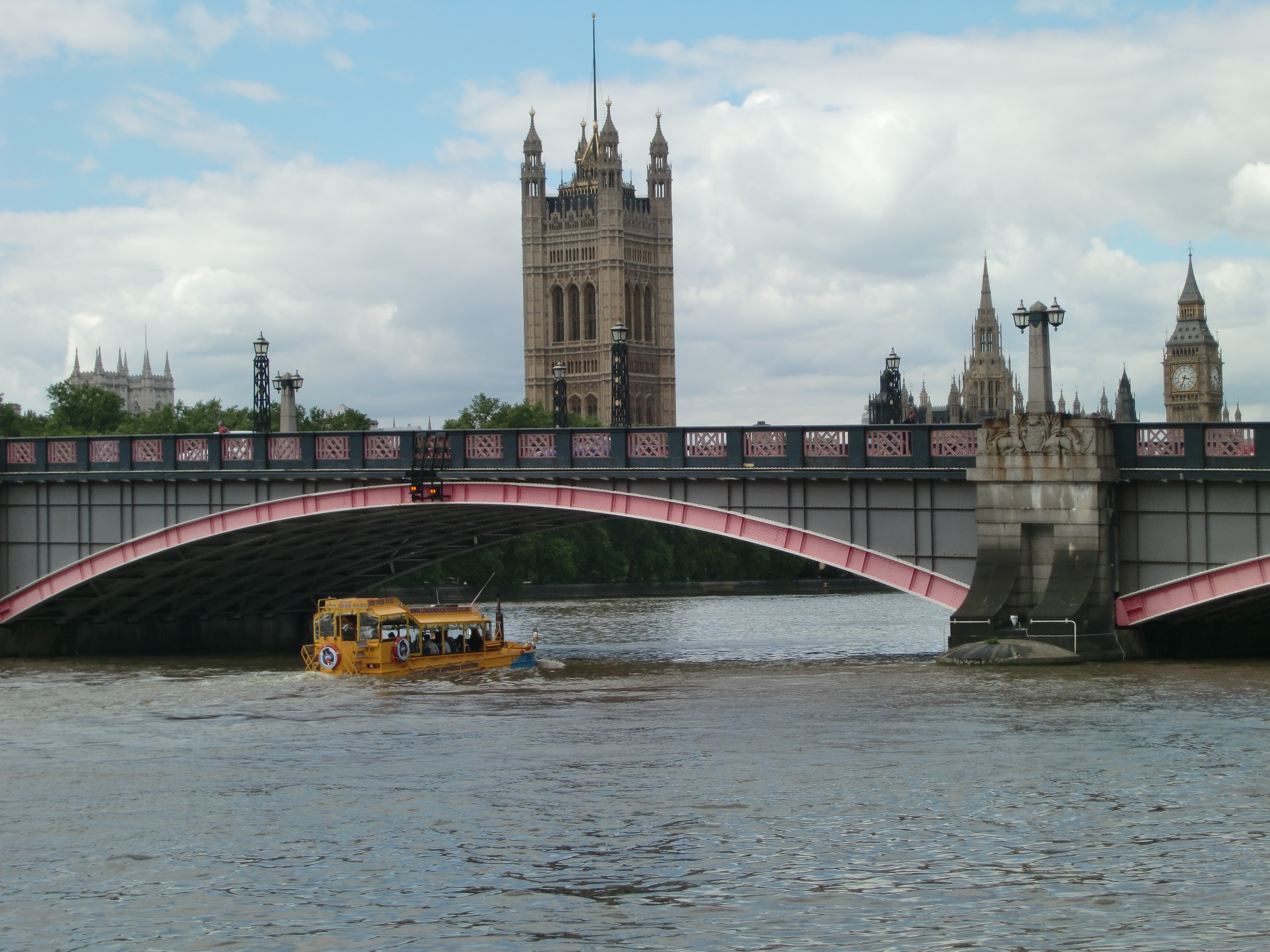
Detail from upstream with DUKW, Victoria Tower in centre

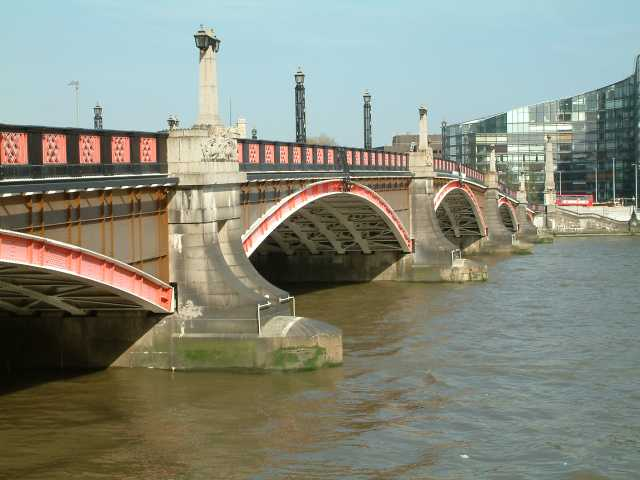
Lambeth Bridge from Millbank, facing east towards Lambeth

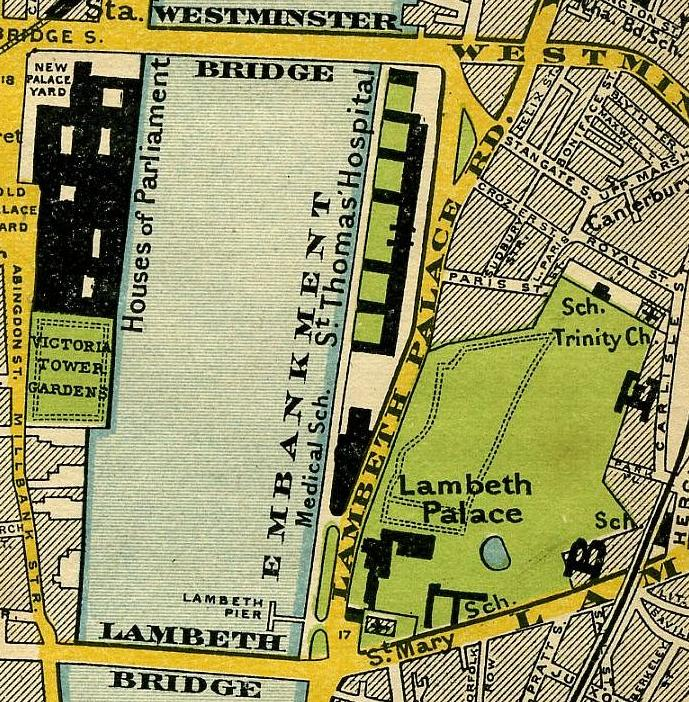
Map of 1897, showing Lambeth Palace, Lambeth Bridge, the Houses of Parliament and Westminster Bridge

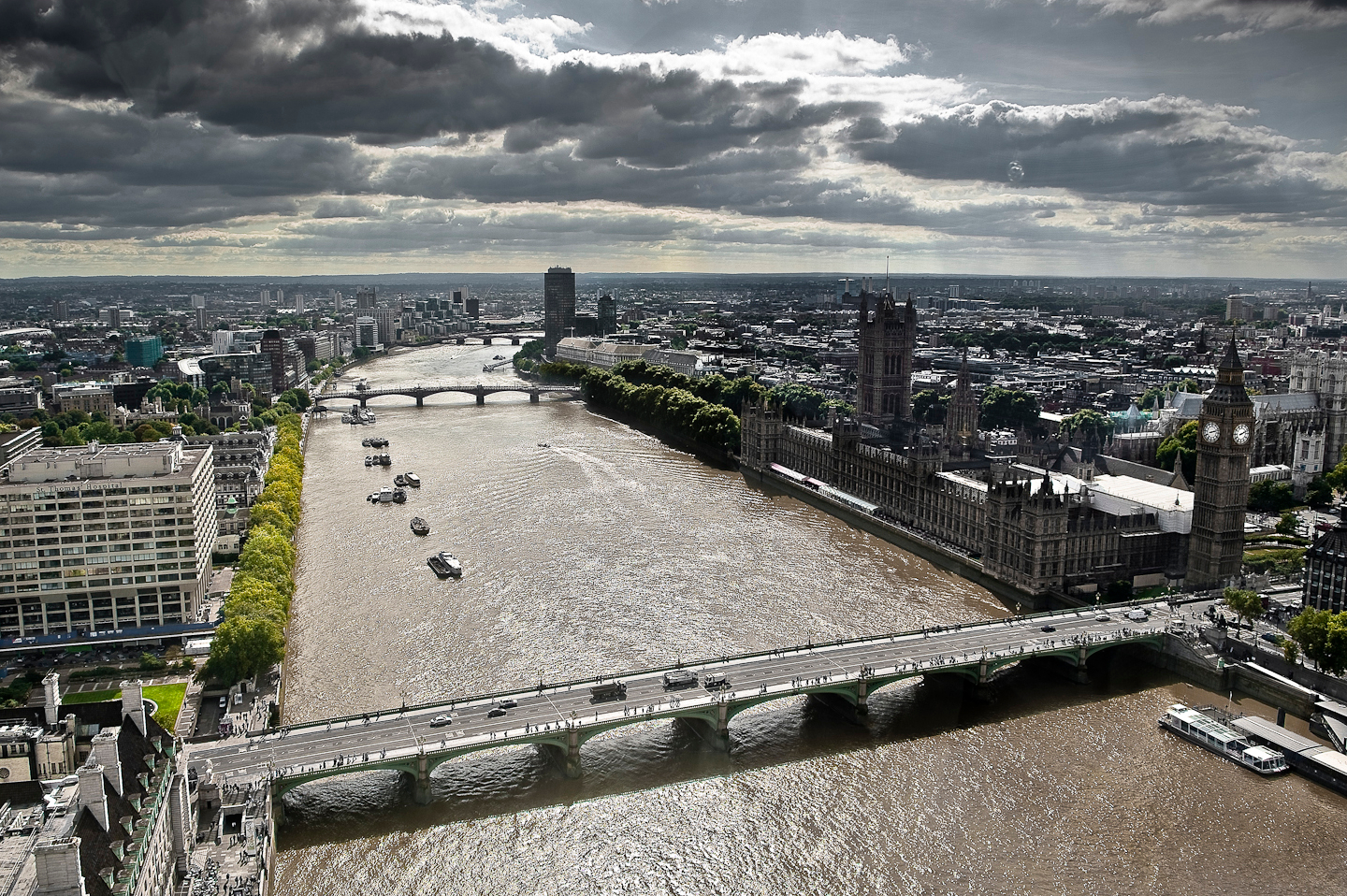
In this view from the London Eye, the bridge in foreground is Westminster Bridge, behind which is Lambeth Bridge and (just visible in the distance) Vauxhall Bridge.

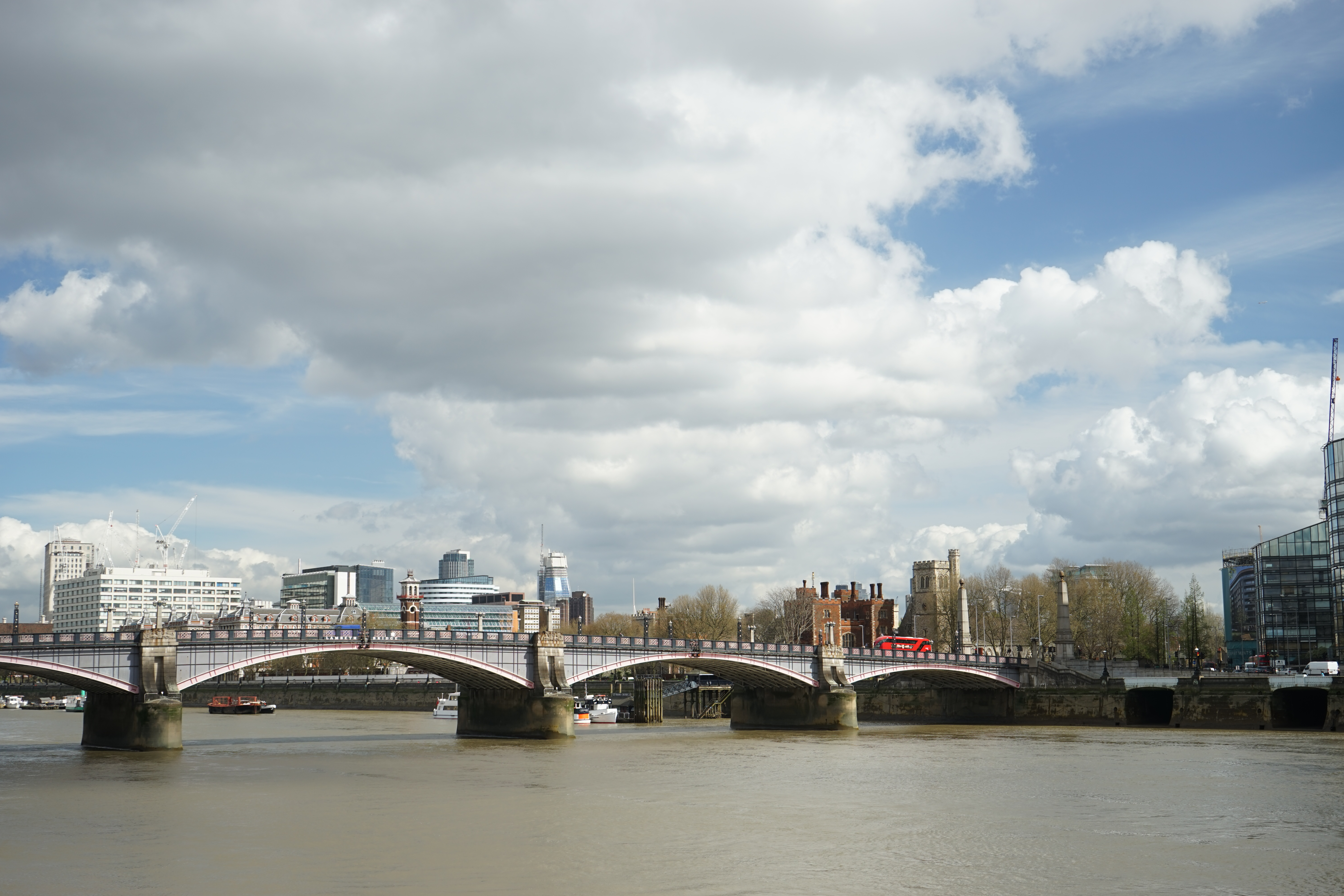
Lambeth Bridge, seen from Millbank, looking north and downstream

Lambeth Bridge is on the site of a horse ferry between the Palace of Westminster and Lambeth Palace on the south bank. Its name lives on in Horseferry Road, which forms the approach to the bridge on the north bank.

The first modern bridge was a suspension bridge, 828 feet (252.4 m) long, designed by Peter W. Barlow. Sanctioned by the Lambeth Bridge Act 1861 (24 & 25 Vict. c. cxvii), it opened as a toll bridge on 10 November 1862. Doubts about its safety, coupled with its awkwardly steep approaches deterring horse-drawn traffic, meant it soon became used almost solely as a pedestrian crossing. It ceased to be a toll bridge in 1879 when the Metropolitan Board of Works assumed responsibility for its upkeep – it was by then severely corroded, and by 1910 it was closed to vehicular traffic.

The London County Council prepared a masterplan for the area, including a replacement road bridge linking to a widened Horseferry Road, which was authorised by London County Council (Lambeth Bridge) Act 1924 (14 & 15 Geo. 5. c. lxvii). Before work had started on the project, the 1928 Thames flood caused extensive destruction of property in the Millbank area. Following the flood the Chelsea Embankment was rebuilt and raised, resulting in some minor redesign of the approaches, and creating the open space to the north of Lambeth Bridge now known as Victoria Tower Gardens South. During the period of delay, the bridge was also redesigned to be able to cope with a higher weight of motorised traffic.

The current structure, a five-span steel arch, designed by engineer Sir George Humphreys and architects Sir Reginald Blomfield and G. Topham Forrest, was built by Dorman Long and opened on 19 July 1932 by King George V. It formerly carried four lanes of road traffic (now reduced to three lanes, one of which is a buses-only lane flowing eastbound) from a roundabout junction by the Lambeth Palace northwards to another roundabout, where the Millbank road meets Horseferry Road .

The bridge is notable at road level for the pairs of obelisks at either end of the bridge, which are surmounted by stone pinecones. However, there is a popular urban legend that they are pineapples, as a tribute to Lambeth resident John Tradescant the younger, who is said to have grown the first pineapple in Britain.

The bridge was declared a Grade II listed structure in 2008, providing protection to preserve its special character from unsympathetic development. The listing designation includes the parapets, lamps, obelisks and the approach walls.

== See also ==
- List of bridges in London
- List of crossings of the River Thames
