= Imperial Chemical House =

Office building in Westminster, London, England

Coordinates: 51°29′42″N 0°07′32.2″W

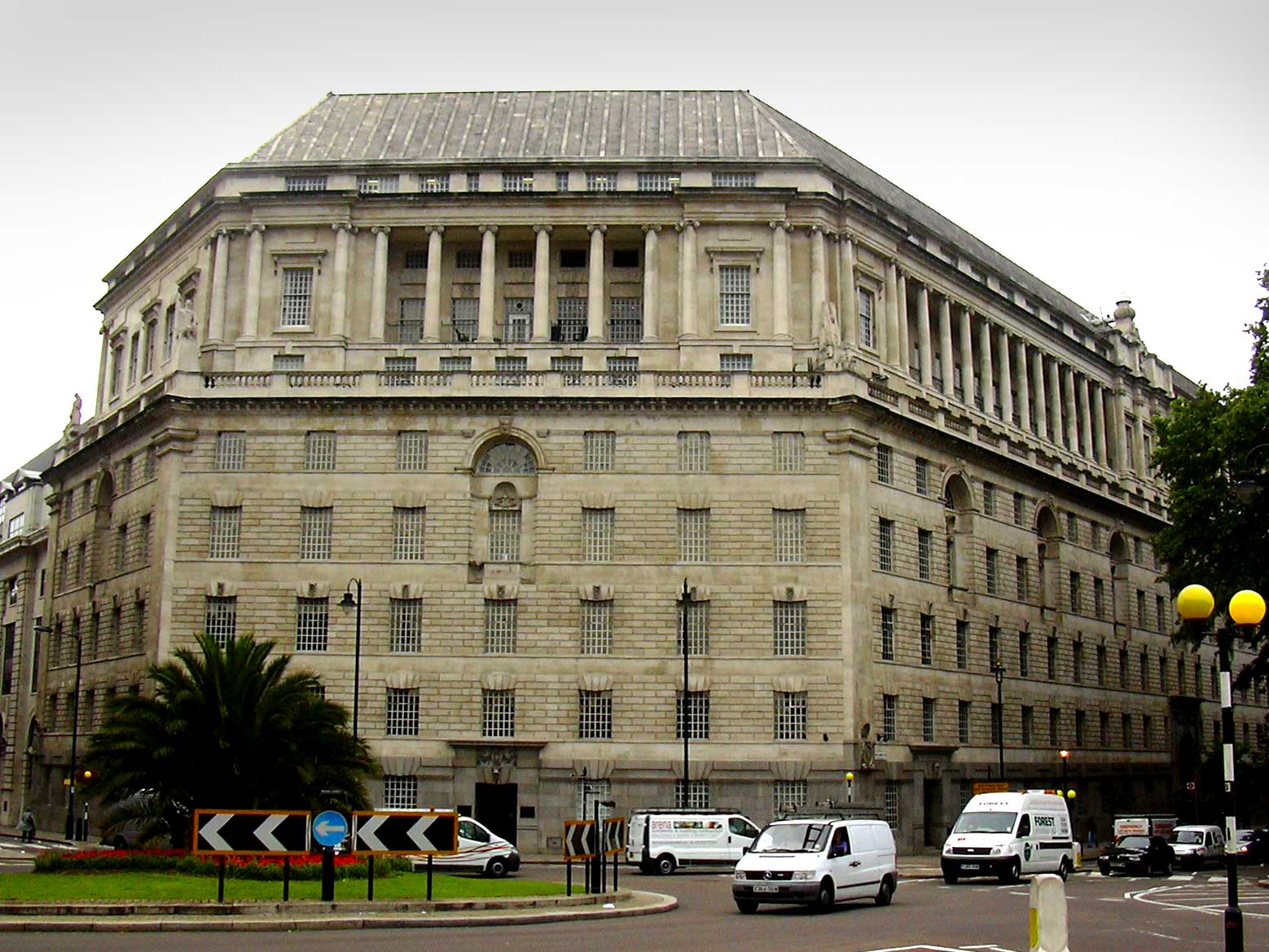
Imperial Chemical House, seen from Lambeth Bridge

Imperial Chemical House is a Grade II listed building situated on Millbank, London, England, near the west end of Lambeth Bridge. It was designed by Sir Frank Baines in the neoclassical style of the inter-war years, and constructed between 1927 and 1929 as the headquarters for the newly created Imperial Chemical Industries (ICI). Thames House, the next building south along Millbank, across Horseferry Road, was also designed by Baines and constructed at the same time.

Both buildings were built to house offices for the newly formed ICI, created in 1926 after the mergers of Nobel Industries, United Alkali, British Dyestuffs and Brunner Mond. The buildings were completed in the aftermath of the 1928 Thames flood, and Lambeth Bridge was also replaced.

Imperial Chemical House was divided in 1987 to create Norwest House at 9 Millbank, and Nobel House at 17 Smith Square. ICI moved out in the 1990s.

== Description ==
Imperial Chemical House has five main storeys, with a four-storey attic and pitched leaded roof. It was constructed on a steel frame, with the ground floor façades faced in grey granite. The higher floors are faced in Portland stone, rusticated on the second to fifth stories. There are 27 bays including three doors along the Millbank façade, seven bays including one door in the corner splay at the junction of Millbank and Horseferry Road, and five bays along Horseferry Road. To the rear, part of the building faces onto Smith Square.

The main entrance at the centre of the Millbank façade rises two storeys, with a decorative carved stone door surround encasing a pair of large panelled doors 20 feet (6.1 m) high and 10 feet (3.0 m) wide, plated in nickel-copper alloy "silveroid" bearing designs by William Bateman Fagan. The six door panels on the left showing scenes of primitive man, and the six panels on the right showing scenes of modern man.

The three main façades are decorated with giant niches spanning the fourth and fifth storeys, five on the Millbank façade, one on the corner splay, and one on Horseferry Road. Each giant niche has a set-back window topped by a peacock sculpture and arched light above, and each is dedicated to a different chemist, with a portrait carved into the keystone and their name carved onto a balcony – four directly associated with ICI and its predecessors, Ludwig Mond, Alfred Mond, Harry McGowan, and Alfred Nobel, and four others, Justus von Liebig, Joseph Priestley, Antoine Lavoisier, and Dmitri Mendeleev.

Giant pilasters on the corners span the first to fifth storeys. Above the fifth storey is an entablature, with balustrade on the parapet above bearing carved allegorical figures in Portland stone. The figures were sculpted by Charles Sargeant Jagger, and represent the industries of construction (The Builder), marine transport, for agriculture (The Sower), and chemistry. Portions of giant order Ionic colonnade span the second and third attic storey on the Millbank façade and the corner block.

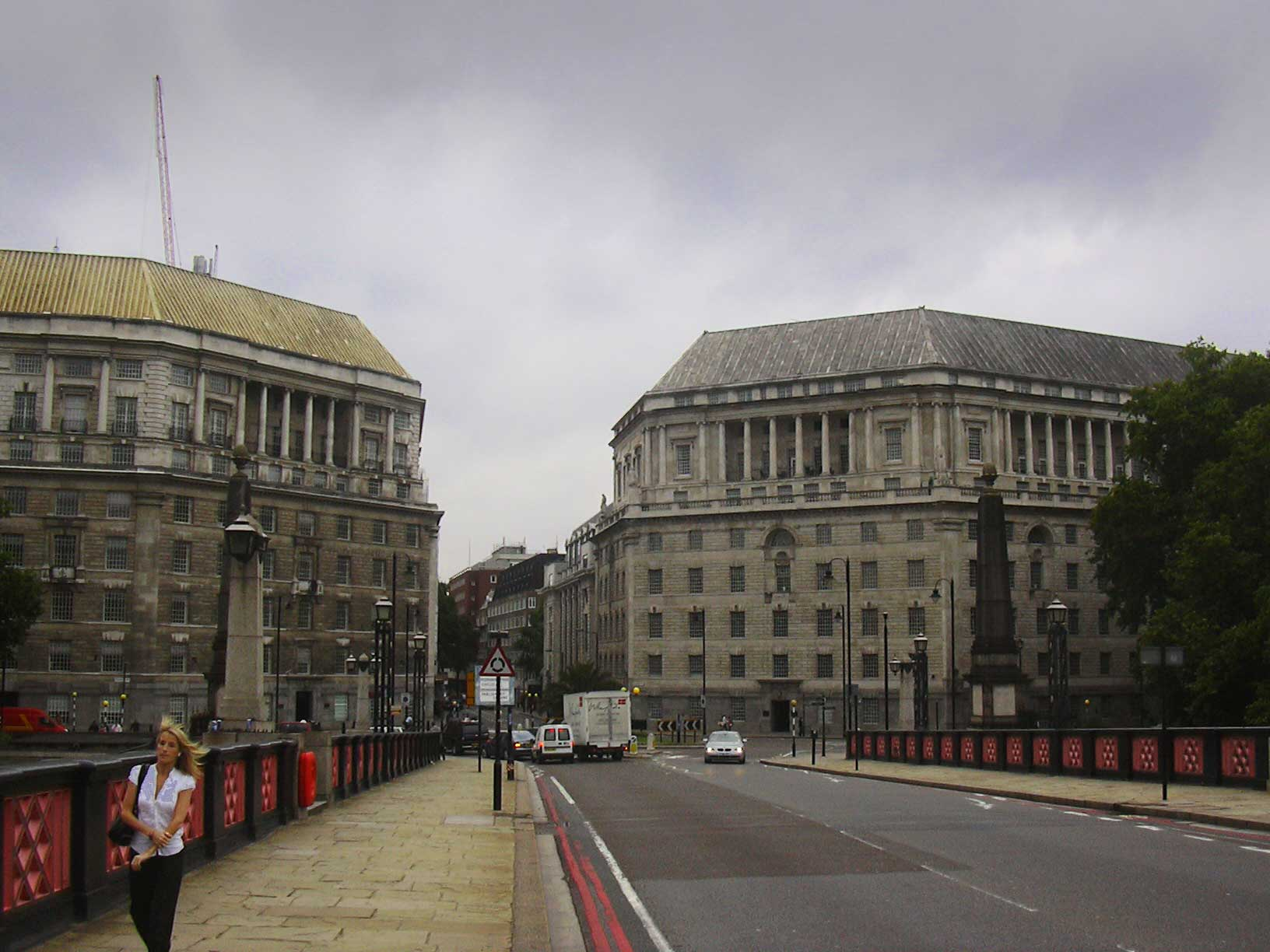
Thames House (left) and Imperial Chemical House (right)

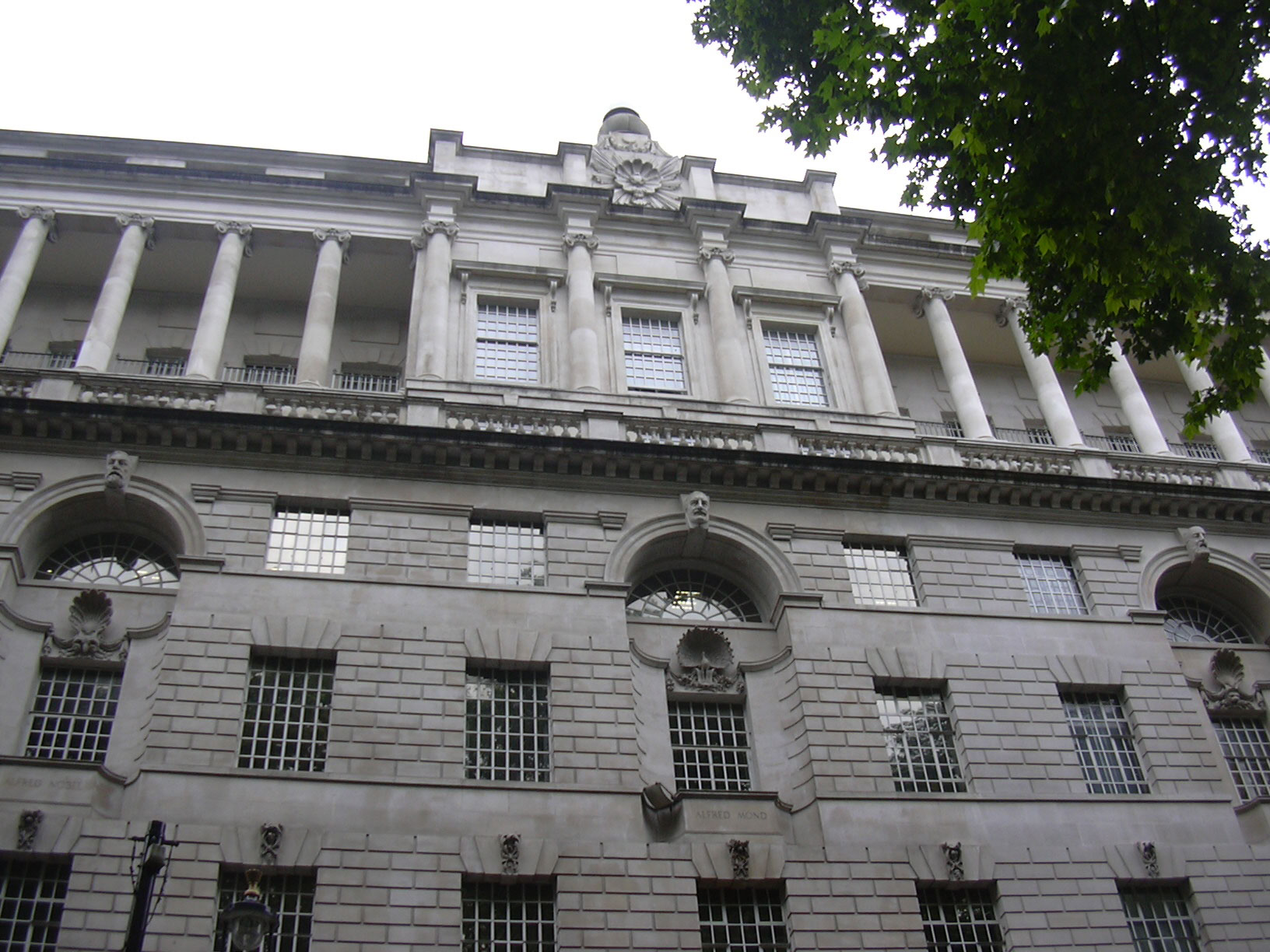
The front of Imperial Chemical House on Millbank

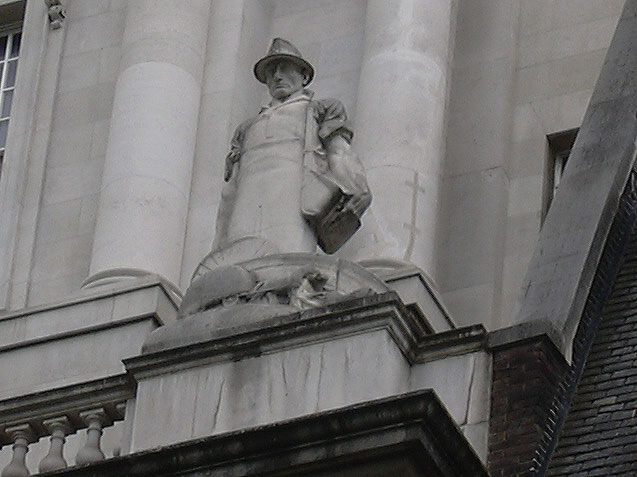
Jagger's sculpture representing Marine Transport

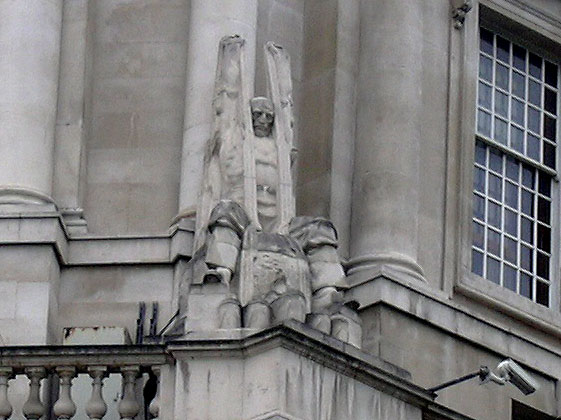
Jagger's sculpture "the Sower"

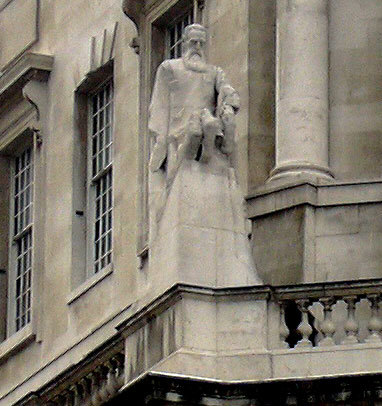
Jagger's sculpture representing Chemistry

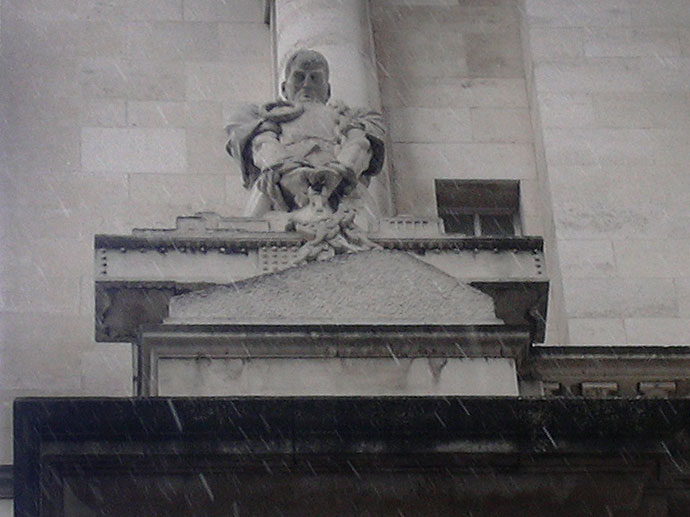
Jagger's sculpture "the Builder"

== History ==
The building was occupied by ICI from the 1920s to the 1990s. It originally contained some 700 rooms, covering 2.8 hectares (6.9 acres), with a floor area of 34,000 square metres (370,000 sq ft), arranged around three large light wells. It was reconfigured internally in 1965 to accommodate staff moved from Thames House North, and divided in 1987–88 to create Norwest House, the southerly portion on 9 Millbank, and Nobel House facing Smith Square to the north. ICI moved out in 1999.

Imperial Chemical House became a grade II listed building in 1981. In 1987, the listing was amended to refer to Norwest House. By 2018 Office of Gas and Electricity Markets moved out of the building.

Nobel House at 17 Smith Square has been leased to the government since 1987. It is currently the headquarters of the Department for Environment, Food and Rural Affairs, between Kings Buildings and Transport House. A proposal has been made to recombine Norwest House and Nobel House, and convert then to the block and Ergon House, the adjacent building to the west along Horseferry Road, to residential use.

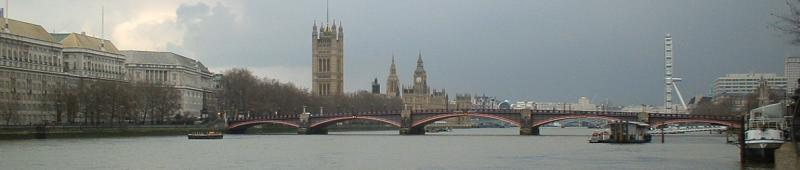
Lambeth Bridge seen from Albert Embankment, looking north, downstream. Thames House and then Imperial Chemical House are on the far left.
