= Statue of John Everett Millais =

Statue in London, England

Coordinates: 51.4909519°N 0.1289246°W

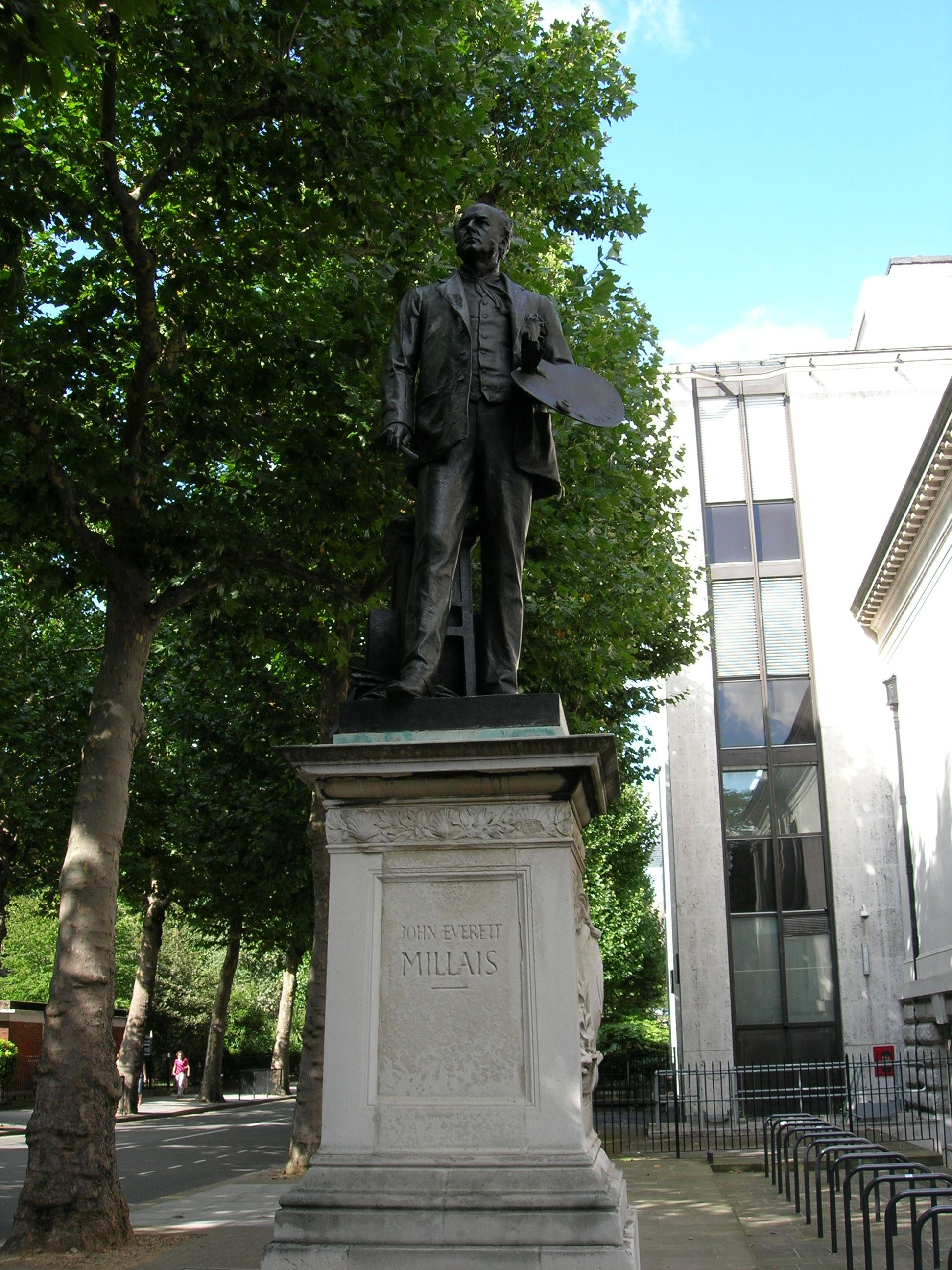

- Location in London
- Location: Burlington House, London, England
- Designer: Thomas Brock
- Type: Statue
- Material: Bronze
- Completion date: 1904
- Dedicated to: John Everett Millais

Statue of John Everett Millais is a bronze statue of the British artist John Everett Millais. It is located in John Islip Street in Pimlico, to the north of the Tate Britain. Designed by the sculptor Thomas Brock it stands on a pedestal of Portland Stone.

Early in his career Millais was a member of the Pre-Raphaelite Brotherhood known for works such as his 1852 painting Ophelia. He subsequently became a notable figure in the Royal Academy, producing history paintings, landscapes and portrait paintings. In 1896 he was elected President of the Royal Academy in succession to Frederic Leighton but died only a few months later. After his death it was proposed a memorial statue be erected to him with the committee headed by the Prince of Wales. Millais' successor Edward Poynter suggested that the statue should be located at the Tate Gallery.

The statue has been listed Grade II on the National Heritage List for England since 1970. In 2000 it was relocated from the North Forecourt of the Tate to its present position.

== Bibliography ==
- Matthews, Petter. '"London's Statues and Monuments'". Bloomsbury Publishing, 2018.
- Smilesz Sam. J. M. W. Turner: The Making of a Modern Artist. Manchester University Press, 2007.
