= Frank Baines (architect) =

British architect

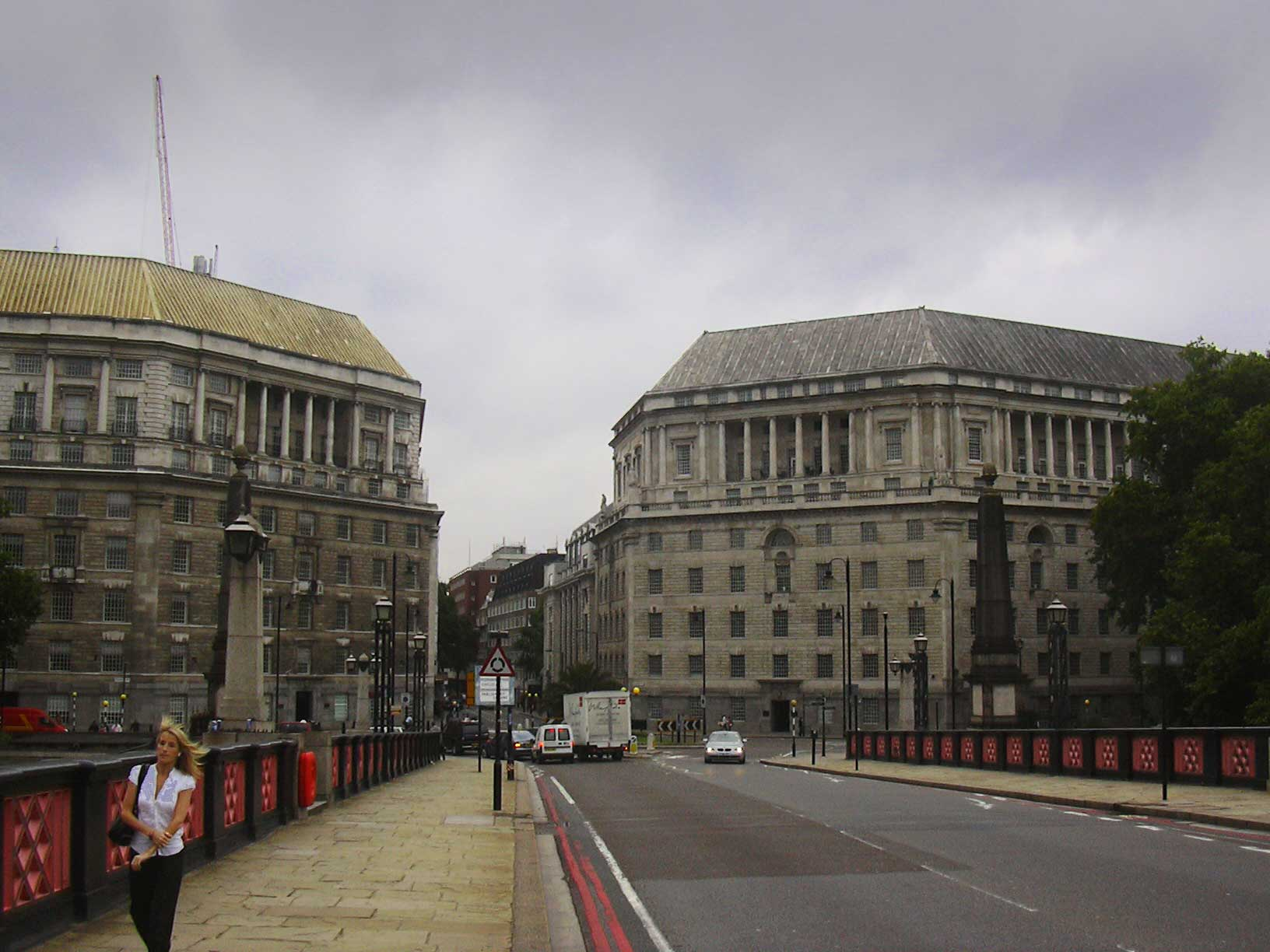
Thames House (left) and Imperial Chemical House (right on London's Millbank)

Sir Frank Baines, KCVO, CBE, FRIBA (1877–1933) was chief architect at the British Office of Works from 1920 to 1927.

His most famous work was Thames House and its neighbour Imperial Chemical House (1929–30) in London. Thames House is currently the headquarters of the British Security Service (MI5) and Imperial Chemical House was built as the headquarters for Imperial Chemical Industries (ICI).

Much of his work involved the conservation and preservation of old buildings, on which he had a worldwide reputation, including Tintern Abbey, Bylands Abbey, Huntingtower Castle, Jedburgh Abbey, Melrose Abbey, and Dryburgh Abbey. He was also adviser on the restoration of Westminster Hall, Eltham Palace Hall, and Caernarfon Castle in connection with the investiture of the Prince of Wales, later Edward VIII.

However, he is also known for perpetuating the arts and crafts style into the mid-20th century, particularly by his large estates at Eltham, Roe Green, Kingsbury, and Camberwell, which in turn influenced housing provision by such bodies as the London County Council. The three larger houses he designed at Loughton also follow this model.

Baines was born in Stepney, and educated at the People's Palace School and later under architect and designer Charles Robert Ashbee. He later divided his life between Clapham, St Keverne Cornwall, and Loughton, Essex, near his brother, Hubert, and sister, Ethel, where he was a keen gardener. Two of his later works were the design of a new house each for the brother and himself in Loughton.

He was found dead on Christmas Day, 25 December 1933, but the death certificate records Christmas Eve as the date of death.

A blue plaque was erected to him in the Uplands, Loughton in 2011.
