= Horseferry Road =

Street in City of Westminster, England

Coordinates: 51.4949°N 0.1313°W

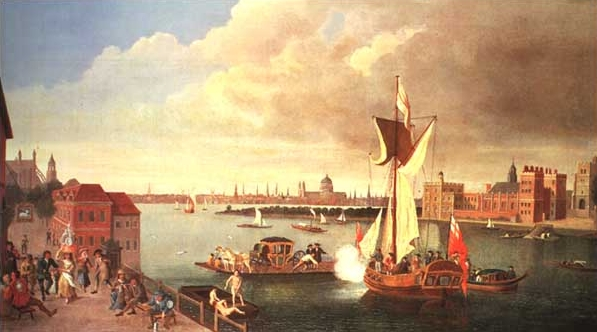
The Thames at Horseferry by Jan Griffier, showing Lambeth Palace at right and St Paul's Cathedral in the distance.

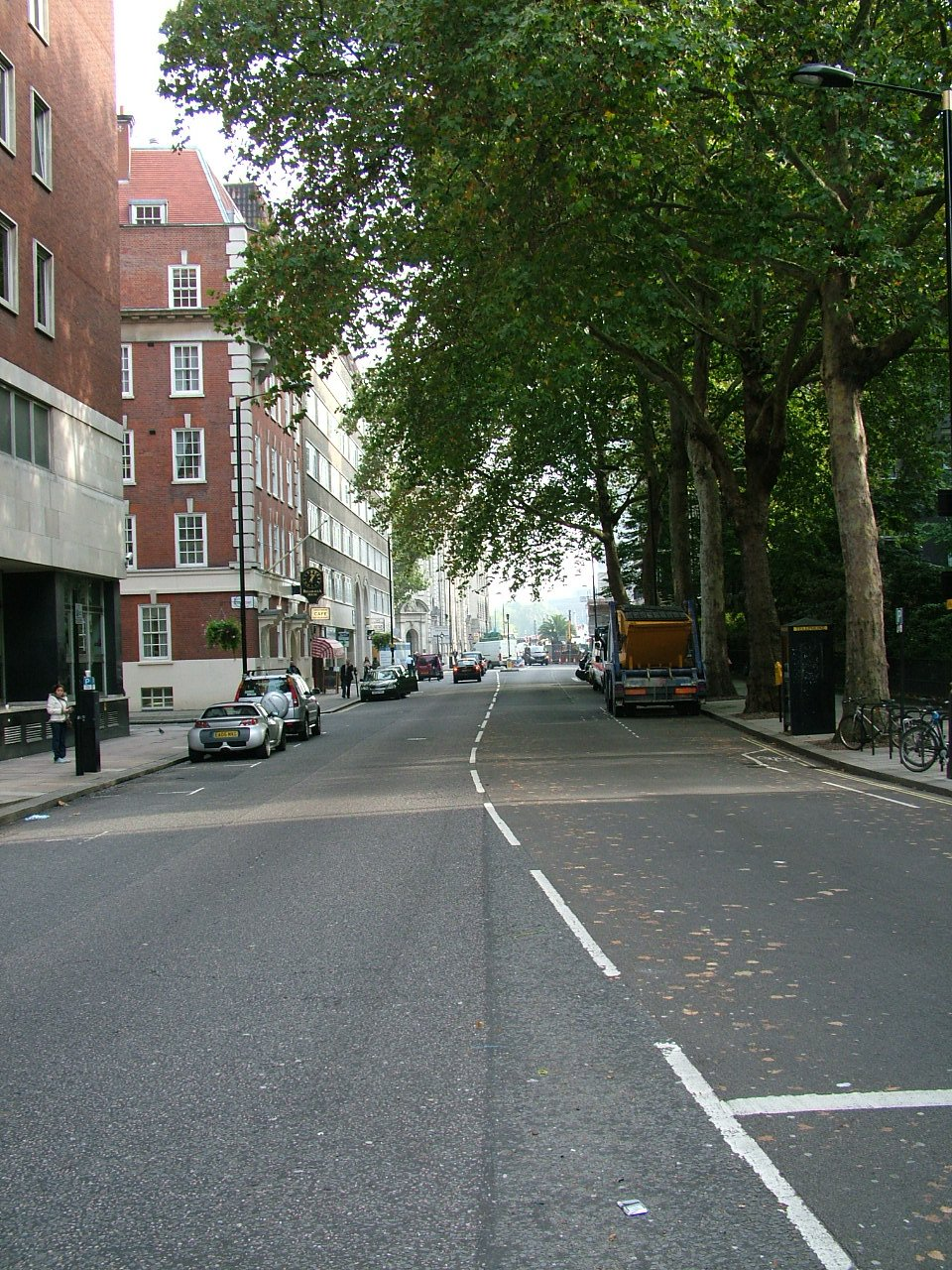
The south end of Horseferry road, facing south, October 2007

Horseferry Road is a street in the City of Westminster running between Millbank and Greycoat Place and designated part of the B323 road, along with Greycoat Place, Artillery Row and Buckingham Gate.

Until 2011, it was the site of City of Westminster Magistrates' Court (which until 2006 was called Horseferry Road Magistrates' Court).

It is not to be confused with streets of the same name in Limehouse, London E14, parallel to Narrow Street, and off Creek Road in Greenwich.

Other notable institutions which are or have been located on Horseferry Road include Broadwood and Sons, the Gas Light and Coke Company, British Standards Institution, the Royal College of Veterinary Surgeons, the Burberry Group, the Environment Agency headquarters in Horseferry House, the National Probation Service, the Department for Transport at no. 33 and Channel 4. The Marsham Street Home Office building backs on to this road. Phyllis Pearsall conceived and created the London A to Z map while living in a bedsit in Horseferry Road.

== Ferry and bridge ==
The road takes its name from the ferry which existed on the site of what is now Lambeth Bridge. Owned by the Archbishop of Canterbury, the ferry was an important crossing over the Thames, from Westminster Palace to Lambeth Palace. The earliest known reference to the ferry dates to 1513, but there may have been a ford near the site in Roman times. The ferry pier was the starting point for the flight of King James II from England in 1689. In 1736, Princess Augusta, who became the mother of George III, crossed the Thames via the horse ferry on the way to her wedding.

In 1734, plans were drawn up for a bridge to replace the ferry. An Act of Parliament was passed in 1736, and the money was raised by lottery and grants. Parliament changed the plans for the position of the bridge, and Westminster Bridge was finished first, resulting in the gradual decline of the ferry. It was eventually replaced on 10 November 1862, when the first Lambeth Bridge was opened. It quickly deteriorated, and was replaced in 1932.

== Buildings ==
=== Horseferry House ===
This was the location of No. 5 (London) Regional Fire Control Centre during World War II, and the headquarters of 26th Middlesex (Cyclist) Volunteer Rifle Corps. The building was most recently used by the Home Office to house Prison and Probation head office staff, and is as of 2007 being converted into residential flats.

=== Westminster College ===
Established by the Methodist Church in 1851, Westminster Training College was on the street until it relocated to Oxford in 1959. Today their Oxford site is the Harcourt Hill Campus of Oxford Brookes University, where their archives and art collections can still be viewed. Their site on Horseferry Road is now the location for the Channel 4 Headquarters, which were built there in 1994.

=== No. 95 ===
The regimental headquarters and museum of the London Scottish Regiment is in a 1985 building at no. 95, on the former site of the Industrial Museum. That Museum was completed in 1914 but was used for educational and social purposes by the Australian Imperial Force (AIF) and Metropolitan Police until the Museum finally opened in it in 1927.

=== AIF Administrative Headquarters ===
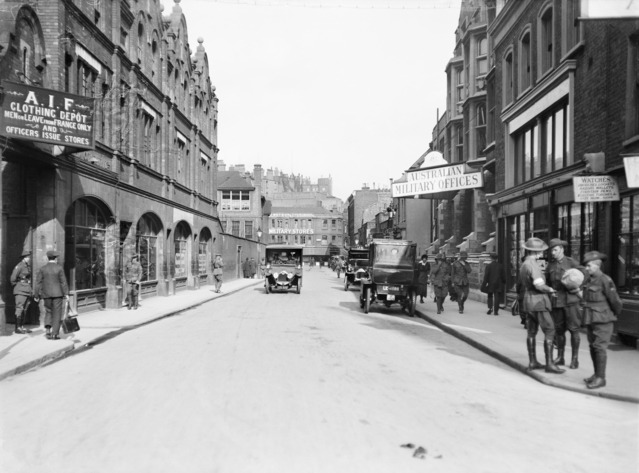
Australian Imperial Force facilities and personnel on Horseferry Road in September 1918

The AIF's administrative headquarters were located on Horseferry Road, in buildings rented from Westminster College throughout the war while the college was evacuated to Richmond. The Australian High Commission established an office for the AIF there in 1915 which initially supported the wounded and ill Australian soldiers which had been sent to the UK from Gallipoli and Egypt for medical treatment. The main body of the AIF Administrative Headquarters arrived in London during May 1916 as part of the transfer of the force from Egypt to France. It remained at Horseferry Road for the rest of the war. The Australian War Records Section and a social club for Australian personnel were also located on Horseferry Road.
