= Thames House =

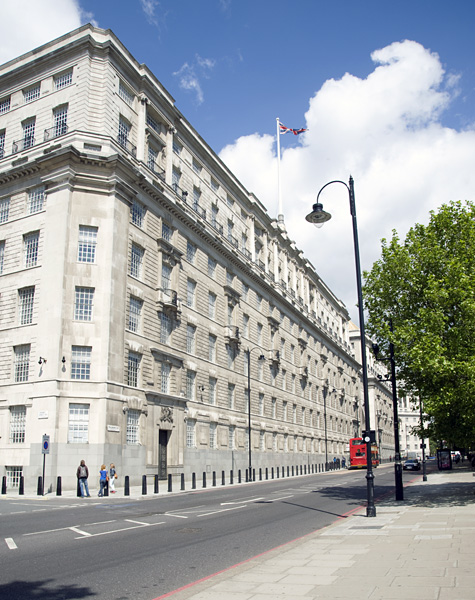
- View of Thames House from Millbank

General information
- Status: Completed
- Type: Office
- Architectural style: Neoclassical
- Location: City of Westminster, 11 and 12 Millbank, London, United Kingdom
- Coordinates: 51°29′38″N 0°07′32″W
- Current tenants: Security Service (MI5)
- Construction started: 1929
- Completed: 1930
- Renovated: 1990–1994
- Renovation cost: £227m
- Owner: HM Government

Technical details
- Material: Portland stone and granite
- Floor count: 8

Design and construction
- Architect: Sir Frank Baines
- Architecture firm: Office of Works
- Other designers: Charles Sargeant Jagger (Sculptures)

Renovating team
- Architect: GMW Architects
- Renovating firm: Property Services Agency and Security Service (MI5)
- Structural engineer: Oscar Faber & Partners
- Quantity surveyor: Northcroft, Neighbour & Nicholson
- Main contractor: J Mowlem & Co.

Other information
- Public transit: Westminster

Listed Building – Grade II
- Official name: Thames House (North and South Blocks With Bridge Link)
- Designated: 16 January 1981
- Reference no.: 1267604

Thames House is an office building in Millbank, London, on the north bank of the River Thames adjacent to Lambeth Bridge. Originally used as offices by Imperial Chemical Industries (ICI), it has served as the headquarters of the United Kingdom's internal Security Service (commonly known as MI5) since December 1994. It also served as the London headquarters of the Northern Ireland Office (NIO) until March 2013.

== History ==
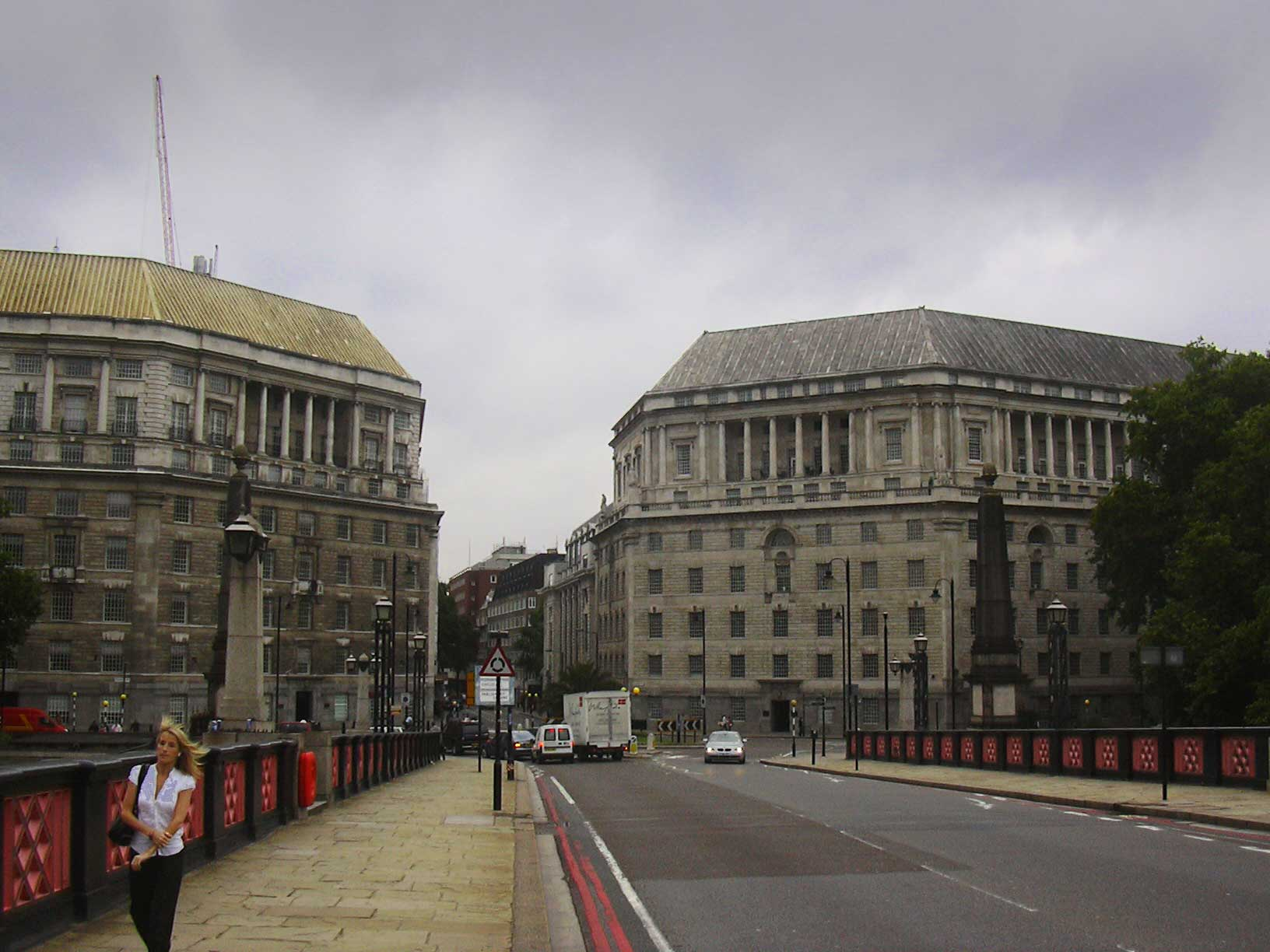
Thames House on the left; Imperial Chemical House on the right.

The building was constructed in 1929–30 by John Mowlem & Co on riverside land cleared after the disastrous 1928 Thames flood severely damaged run-down residential properties. It was built to designs by Sir Frank Baines, of the Government's Office of Works. It is of design uniform with but not identical to Imperial Chemical House which is opposite it on the north side of Horseferry Road; while Imperial Chemical House remained exclusively for ICI until its exit, Thames House had additional tenants alongside ICI throughout history, including the London headquarters of International Nickel Ltd. Baines's design owes much to the 'Imperial Neoclassical' tradition of Sir Edwin Lutyens and deliberately ties in with the Imperial design of Lambeth Bridge when it was redesigned from 1929. High up on the frontage are statues of St George and Britannia sculpted by Charles Sargeant Jagger. It was owned by Thames House Estates until it was sold to the British Government in 1994. Thames House Estates was jointly owned by ICI and Prudential for many years and subsequently was wholly owned by ICI.

The building has been listed Grade II on the National Heritage List for England since 16 January 1981.

== MI5 and NIO headquarters ==
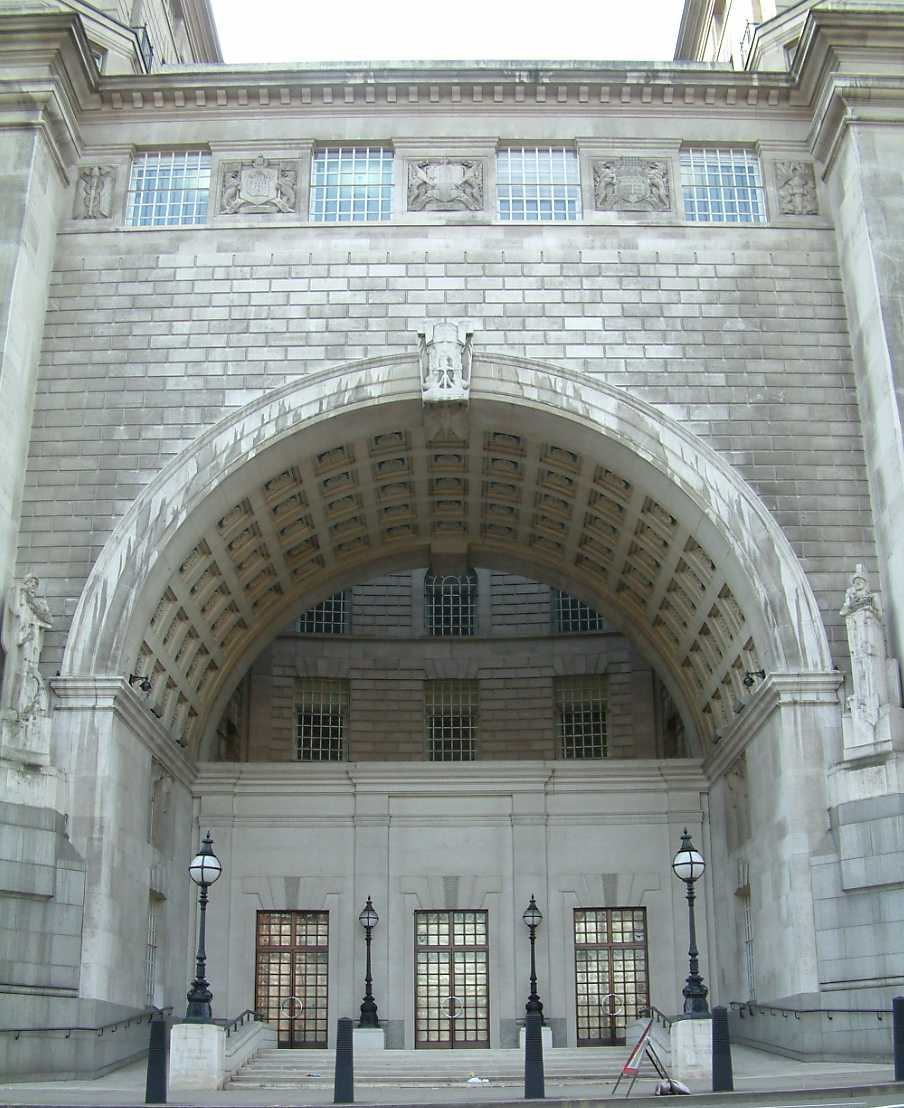
The archway, showing the GMW infill extension built for MI5

Thames House was first used by MI5 between 1934 and 1939: the service was located on the top floor of the South Block.

The service relocated to Blenheim Palace for much of the Second World War and then moved to Leconfield House after the war before relocating to 140 Gower Street in 1976. The dispersed and dilapidated state of its previous buildings at 140 Gower Street (headquarters) and Curzon Street House (registry, administration and technical services) led MI5 to seek a new home in the late 1980s. The Secret Intelligence Service (MI6) were engaged in a simultaneous hunt for new headquarters and consideration was given to co-location of the two. However this proposal was abandoned, due to the lack of buildings of adequate size (existing or proposed) and the security considerations of becoming a single target for attacks. At the same time, Thames House, which was largely used as government offices by then, became vacant when the Department of Energy left the southern half in 1989 and it was decided to convert and refit much of it for MI5's use. The GMW Partnership undertook the design and Mowlem carried out the necessary reconstruction work from 1990, which included part-infilling of the building's distinctive archway. An automated miniature monorail within the building brings files up from the basement of Thames House to staff working within.

The refurbished Thames House was officially opened on 30 November 1994 by Prime Minister John Major.

The building was shared with the Northern Ireland Office (NIO) until that organisation moved to 1 Horse Guards Road alongside HM Treasury and the Cabinet Office in 2013.

On 1 June 2007, the building (other than the steps that give access to it) was designated as a protected site for the purposes of Section 128 of the Serious Organised Crime and Police Act 2005. The effect of the act was to make it a specific criminal offence for a person to trespass into the building.

== Popular culture ==
Until its seventh series, the BBC television series Spooks used the exterior and lobby of the Freemasons' Hall in Great Queen Street as a location for the show's portrayal of Thames House. Since then Thames House has been used, although Freemasons' Hall is still used to show the entrance to the building.

The third series of the BBC television series Torchwood used Thames House as the setting for the arrival of an alien species on Earth.

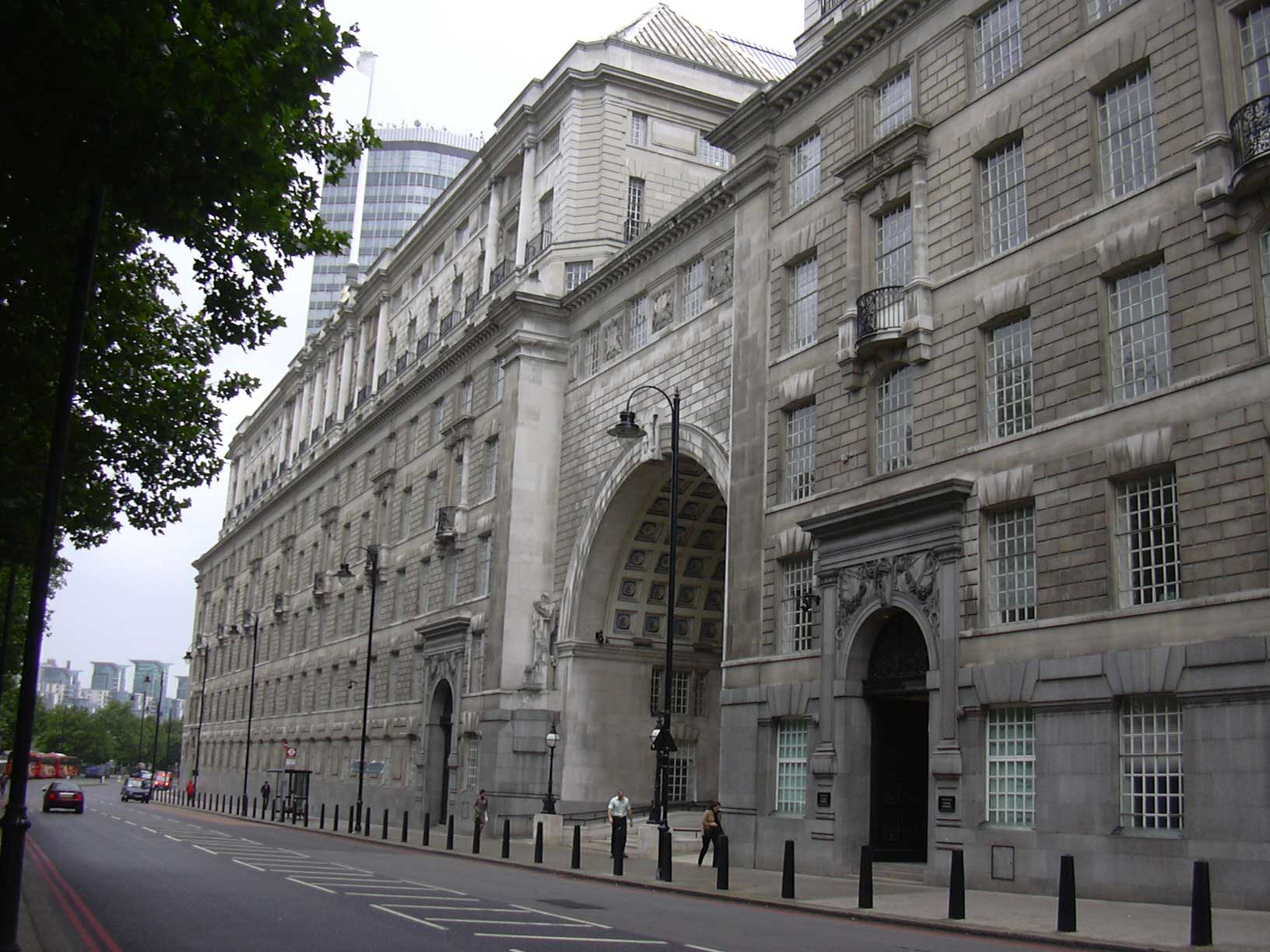
Thames House seen from Millbank

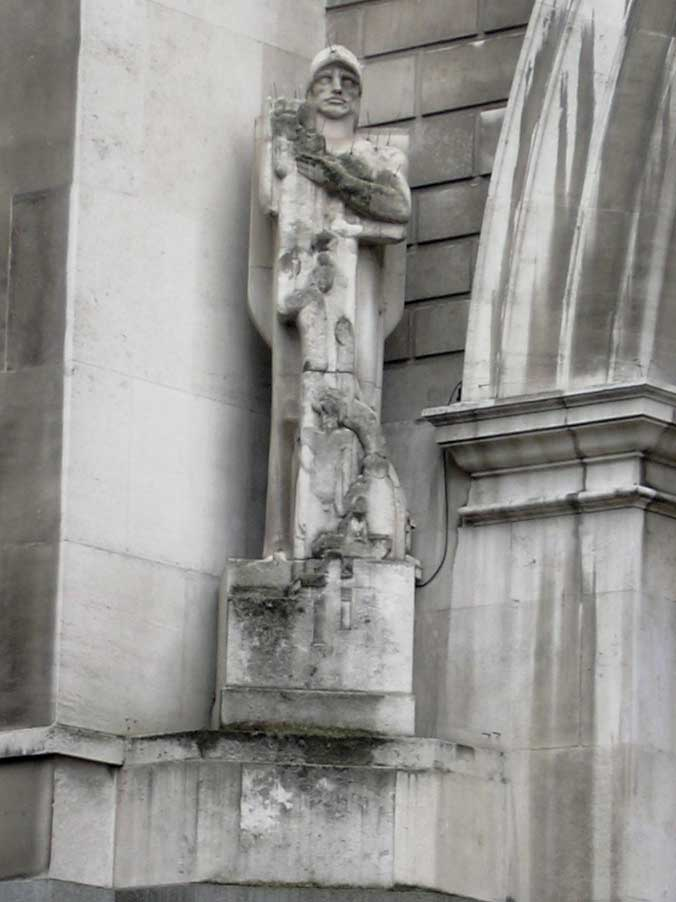
Jagger's St. George figure on the exterior

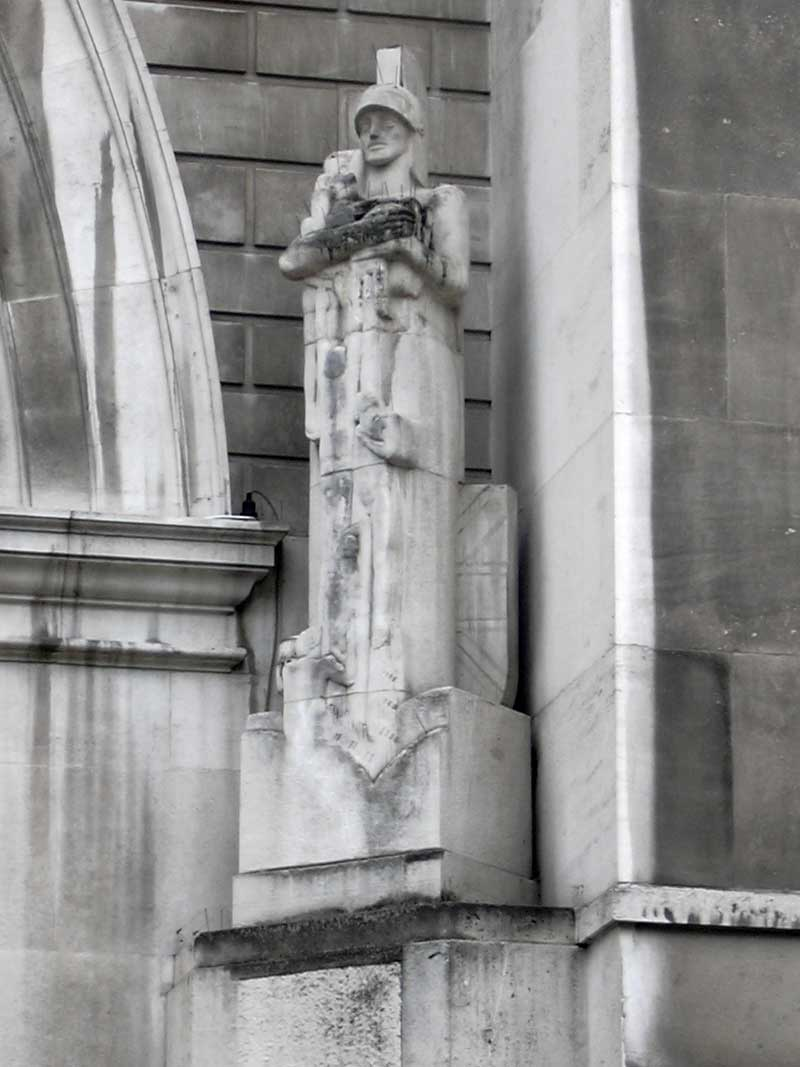
Jagger's Britannia figure on the exterior

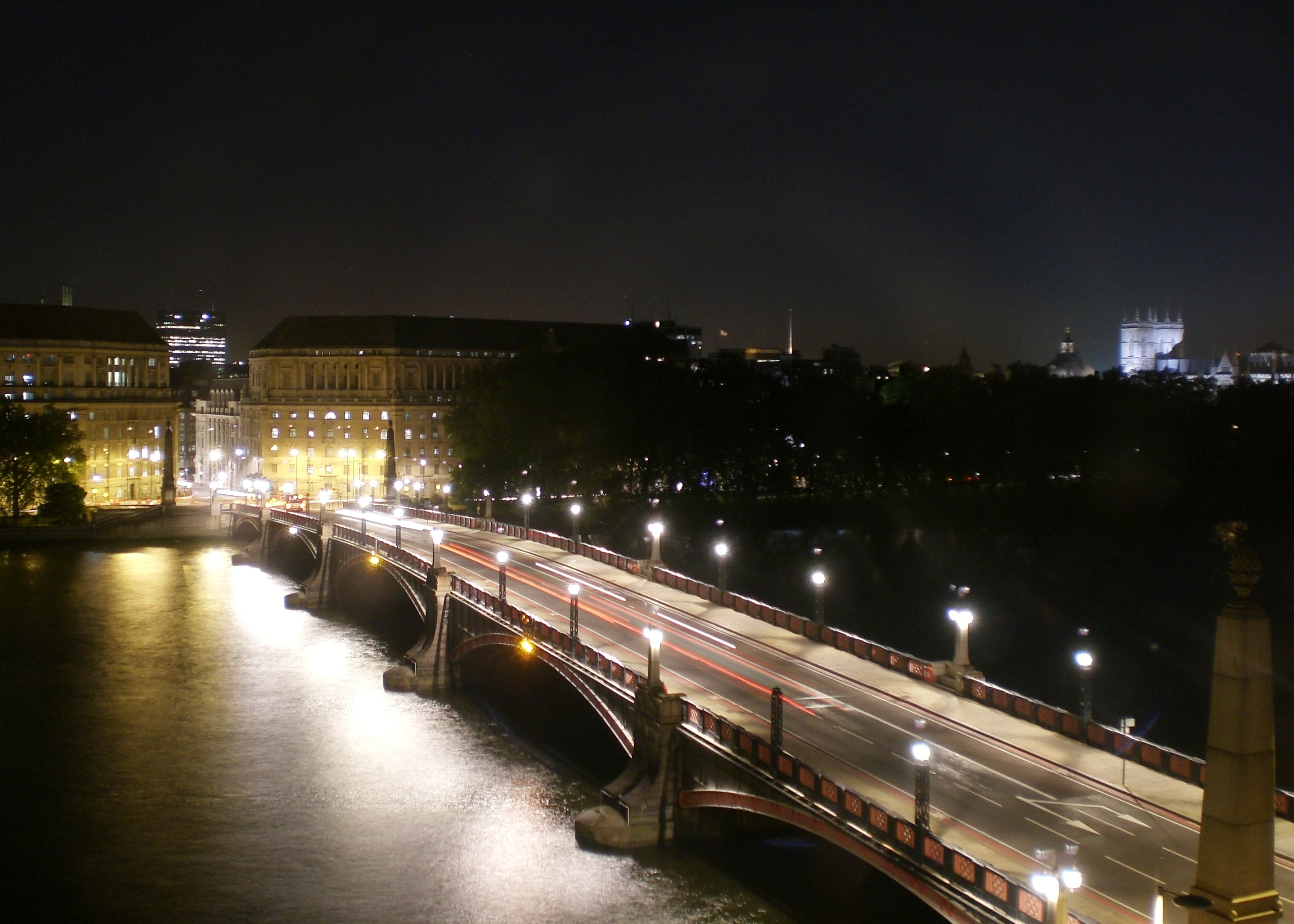
Thames House at night

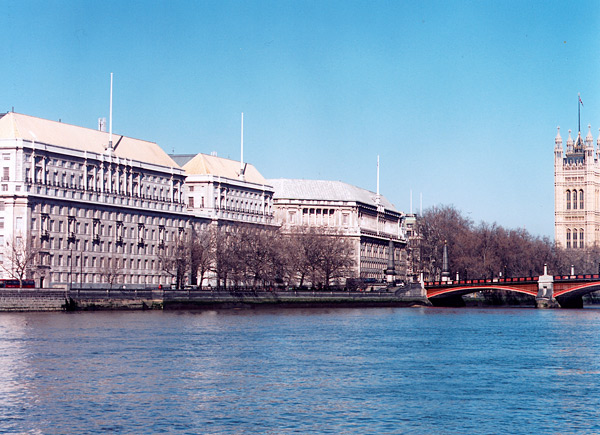
Thames House and Lambeth Bridge, looking downriver

== See also ==
- SIS Building – headquarters of the Secret Intelligence Service (MI6)
- The Doughnut – headquarters of the Government Communications Headquarters (GCHQ)
