= Millbank =

Area of central London

Coordinates: 51.4915°N 0.1295°W

- Location within Greater London
- OS grid reference: TQ295795
- London borough: Westminster
- Ceremonial county: Greater London
- Region: London
- Country: England
- Sovereign state: United Kingdom
- Post town: LONDON
- Postcode district: SW1
- Dialling code: 020
- Police: Metropolitan
- Fire: London
- Ambulance: London
- UK Parliament: Cities of London and Westminster
- London Assembly: West Central

Millbank is an area of central London in the City of Westminster. Millbank is located by the River Thames, east of Pimlico and south of Westminster. Millbank is known as the location of major government offices, Burberry headquarters, the Millbank Tower and prominent art institutions such as Tate Britain and the Chelsea College of Art and Design.

== History ==
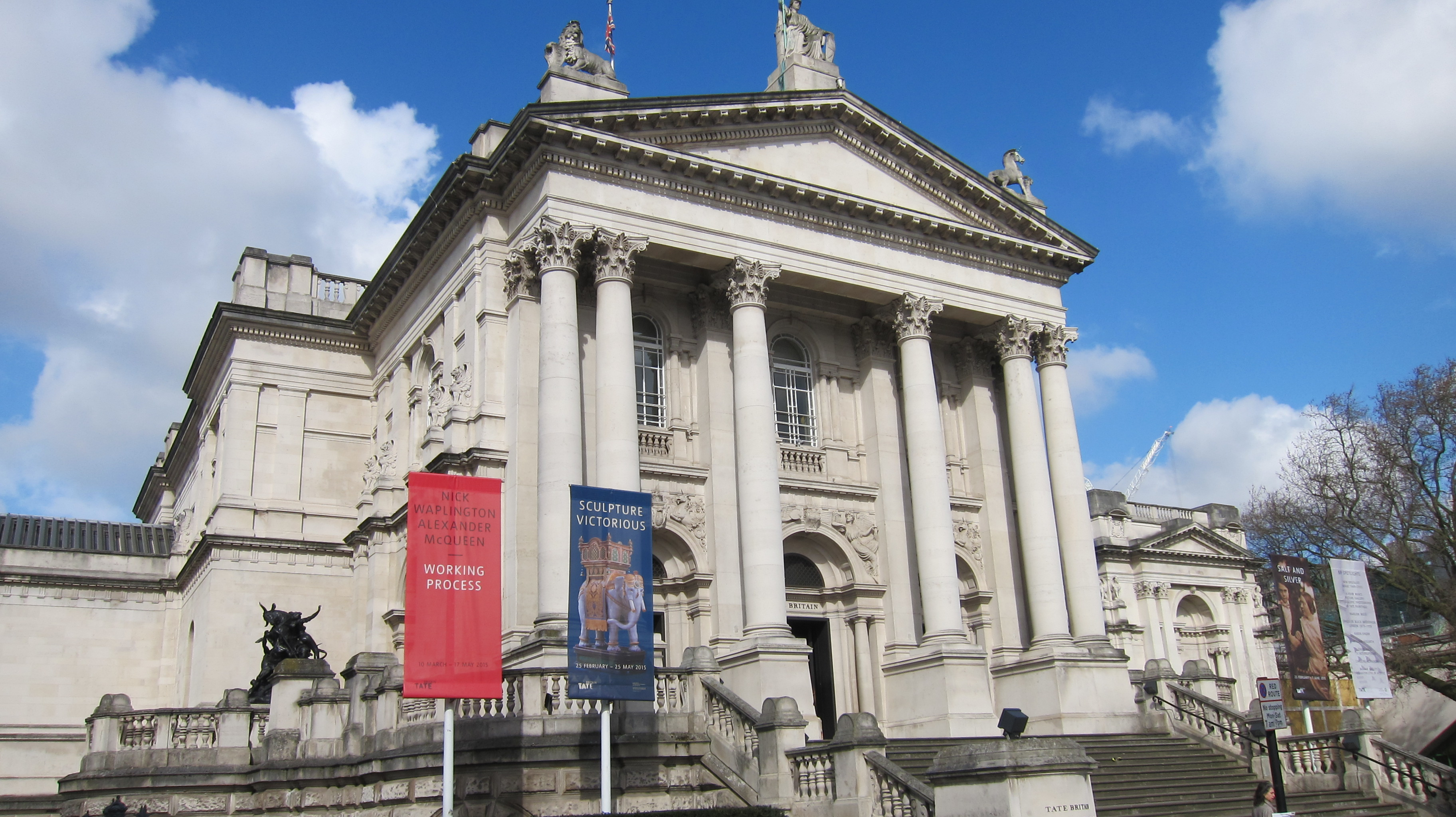
Tate Britain, Millbank

The area derives its name from a watermill owned by Westminster Abbey that once stood at a site close to present day College Green. Norden's survey, taken during the reign of Elizabeth I in 1573, records the existence of such a mill although much of the area that comprises Millbank today, was referred to by Samuel Pepys and others as Tothill Fields. Described as a place of plague pits and a "low, marshy locality" suitable for shooting snipe in the nearby "bogs and quagmires".

After Cromwell's victory at the Battle of Worcester in September 1651, some 4,000 defeated Royalists were imprisoned at Tothill Fields prior to being sold as slaves to merchants trading with Africa and the West Indies. Facilities at the prison camp on the marshy ground were so poor that 1,200 prisoners were recorded as having died in the primitive conditions.

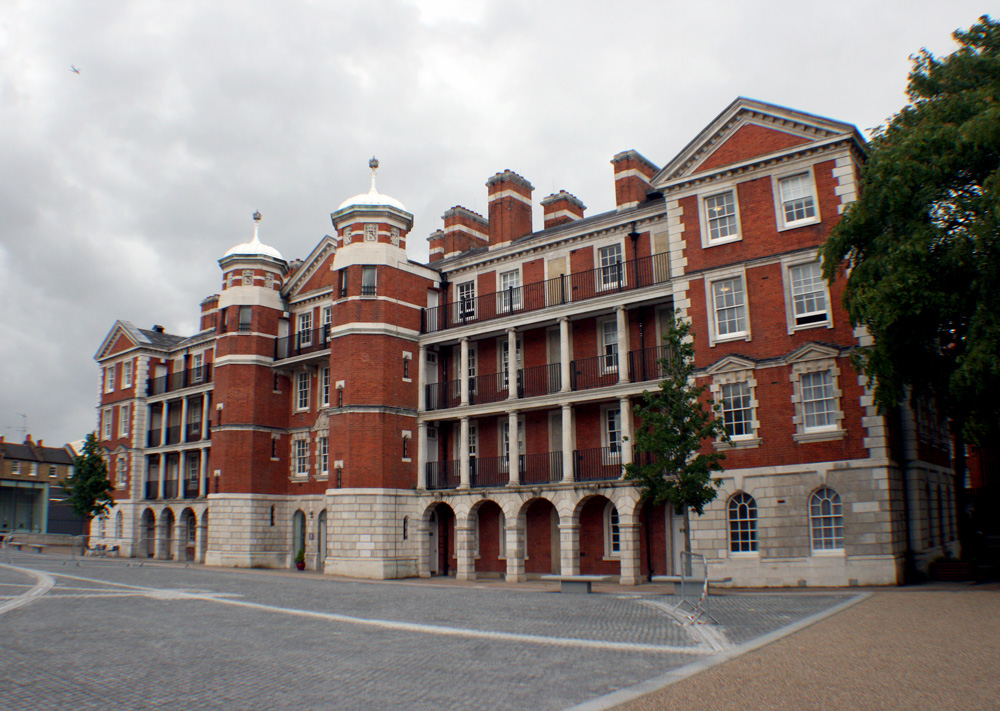
Chelsea College of Art and Design. 1907 building previously served as the Royal Army Medical College

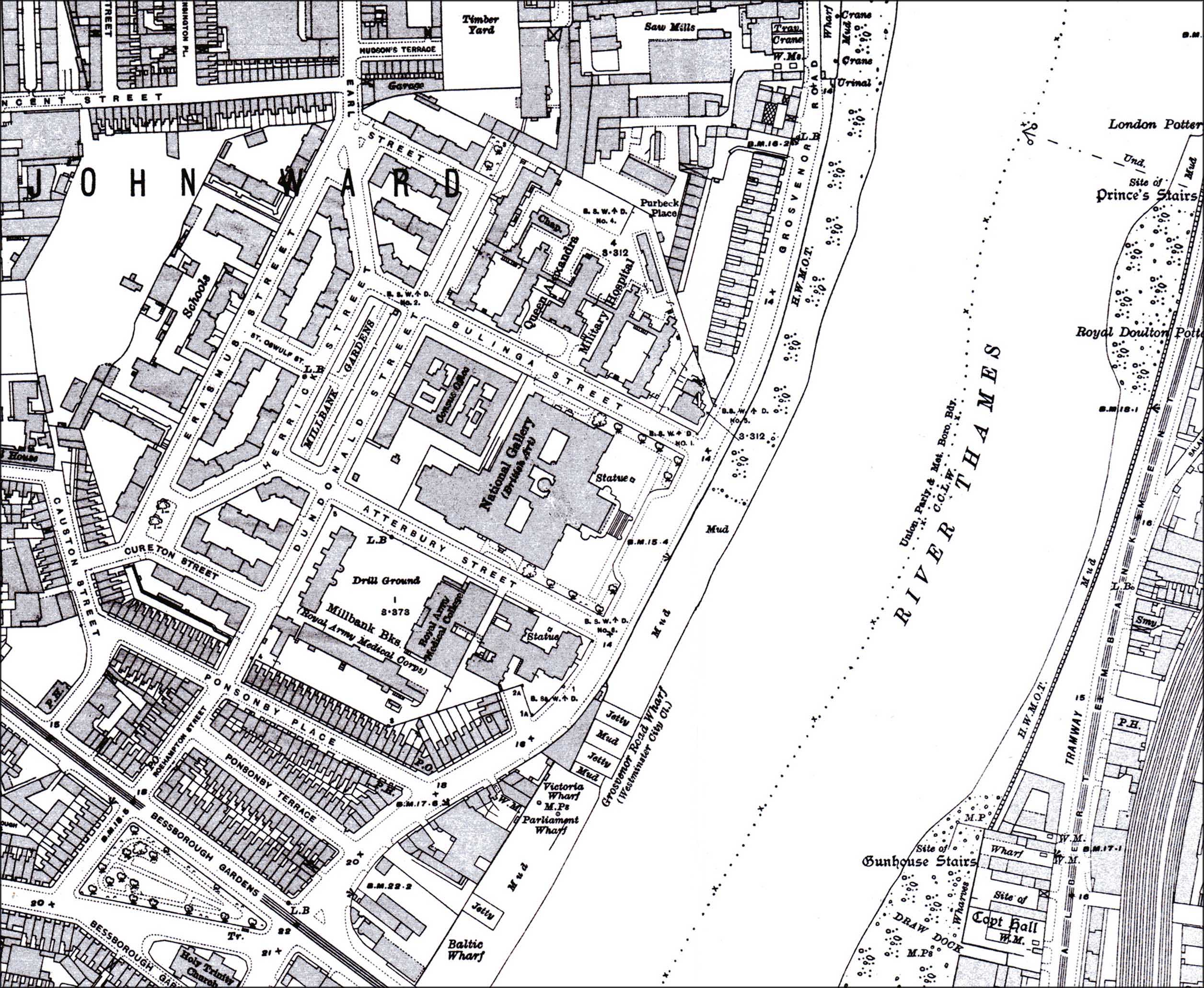
Ordnance Survey maps of London extract for 1916 showing area around the Tate

Prior to the development of Millbank Prison in 1816, the area was sparsely covered with residential houses, but did feature a distillery by the river owned by a Mr. Hodge and numerous small almshouses, bridewells and pest houses for the poor, criminally inclined and sick. Baltic Wharf, a site just to the north of Vauxhall Bridge, was for much of the 19th century the location of a Henry Castle & Son, a ship breaking and timber merchant. Numerous wooden ships of the line of the Royal Navy were dismantled at this location, their ornate figureheads often displayed on the gates and perimeter of the yard walls.

Millbank's general appearance today dates from the 1930s, when the area was extensively rebuilt to repair damage caused by the 1928 Thames flood disaster, following the collapse of a 25-metre-long section of the Thames Embankment. Millbank shares the name of the main road (A3212) along the north bank of the River Thames, extending northwards from Vauxhall Bridge to Abingdon Street, just south from Parliament Square. There are parliamentary offices situated across this road, notably No.7, built as the headquarters of British American Tobacco. The road was created as part of the Thames Embankment in the mid 19th century and lies above a large interceptor sewer.

The former Royal Army Medical College, situated at Millbank, is the site where the vaccine for typhoid was first developed, and in the late 19th century, was where the world's first modern prison (Millbank Prison) was established. The listed site has since been renovated as a purpose-built arts college for the Chelsea College of Art and Design in 2005. The Tate Britain art gallery (former Tate Gallery) is directly opposite near the end of Vauxhall Bridge, providing a distinct arts presence in the area.

The headquarters of the British chemicals giant ICI was originally located at Imperial Chemical House on Millbank (The Smith Square entrance of which was called Nobel House) before it relocated to Manchester Square, also situated in London. The headquarters for the Northern Ireland Office, MI5 and Thames House are also nearby.

On 18 December 1973, the Provisional Irish Republican Army (IRA) exploded a bomb on Thorney Street at 8:50am. The bomb resulted in over 50 people injured, including two seriously (see 1973 Westminster bombing).

Millbank Studios reside in the area as an independent broadcast company, owned by ITV. The studio is situated opposite the Houses of Parliament. The BBC Parliament broadcasting channel is also situated nearby (intended to broadcast parliamentary and general political coverage on behalf of the BBC). No.4 is the location commonly used by broadcasters for producing coverage of the Westminster area, including the BBC, Sky News and ITV. Neighbouring College Green is used as a setting for interviewing politicians outdoors. Foreign countries' broadcasters also have bureaus in the Millbank studio compound. Australian broadcasters ABC, Seven and Nine all have bureaus in the building. Channel Ten (of Australia) used to have an office as well, but it was scrapped due to financial difficulties. Japan's broadcaster NHK has an office in the compound as well. RTÉ News and Current Affairs also have their London bureau at the same location.

== Notable buildings ==
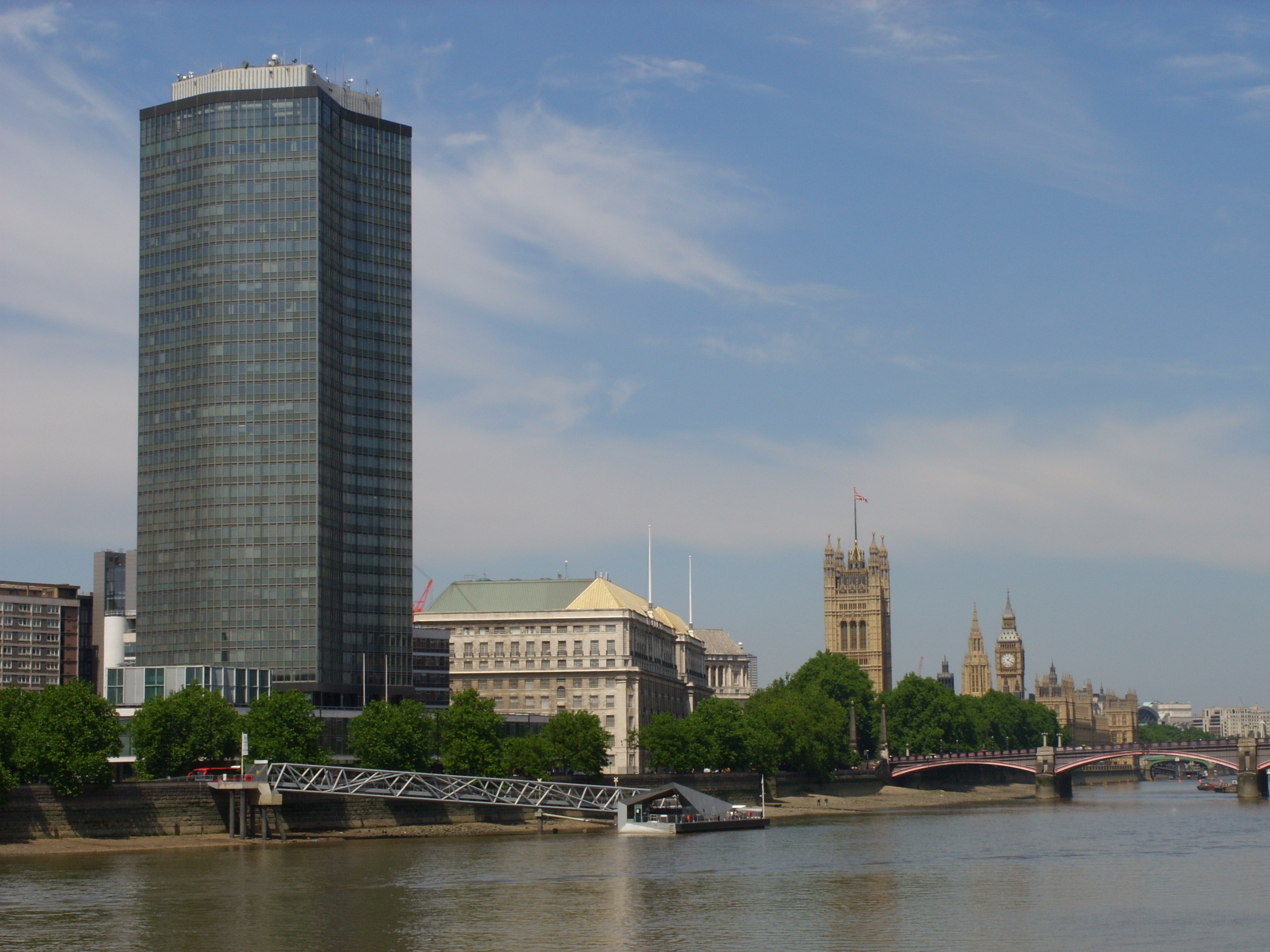
Millbank Tower from Vauxhall, with Thames House and the Palace of Westminster visible in the background.

Millbank Estate is a large but highly regarded Grade II-listed red-brick housing estate that gives the area behind Tate Britain a distinct character. The estate was built between 1897 and 1902, the bricks being recycled from Millbank Prison, which had closed in 1890. The 17 buildings, comprising one of London's earliest social housing schemes, are named after distinguished painters such as Turner, Gainsborough, Millais, etc. The estate has 562 flats, all managed on behalf of Westminster City Council by MEMO, the largest tenant management organisation in Westminster. The estate's management board is elected annually from the resident population. Half of the estate's flats are private leaseholds, the other half are rented from Westminster City Council. The estate's buildings are maintained by a regular works program.

In 1914–1916, architects John W. Simpson and Maxwell Ayrton designed and built 4 Millbank, a six-story Neoclassical office building for the Offices of the Crown Agents for the Colonies. This structure has since been converted into multi-let office building with a central, glass-roofed atrium.

Hide Tower is a 20-storey building (with an additional walk-up penthouse level) of 162 flats with a garden and a community hall. When built in 1962 it was the tallest all-residential building in Europe. Approximately a quarter of the accommodation is privately rented; half is rented from Westminster City Council and the remainder is owner-occupied. The name was derived from the "hide", an old English land measure (used in the Domesday Survey of 1086).

Millbank Tower is a large, modernistic office complex between the River Thames, Millbank Estate and Tate Britain Gallery. It has several restaurants and a public garden. Before the 1997 general election, the Labour Party acquired two floors of the building as its headquarters. The £1 million annual rent, however, forced the party to vacate the tower in 2001 for 16 Old Queen Street, Westminster. In British politics, the term "Millbank Machine" or "Millbank tendency" (a play on "Militant tendency") has been linked with the activities of spin doctors. The Conservative Party also formerly had its headquarters, CCHQ, based in the tower.

== Public transport ==
Millbank Millennium Pier is a modern River Thames pier structure. A regular service by a Damien Hirst-designed riverboat connects Tate Britain with Tate Modern.

The nearest London Underground stations are Westminster, Pimlico and Victoria. London Victoria station is also a National Rail mainline terminus with an adjacent national coach station. Waterloo and Charing Cross stations are also nearby. Millbank is well connected by buses.

== See also ==
- Damage to the area, including the Tate, from the 1928 Thames flood
