= Official Secrets Act 1889 =

Act of the Parliament of the United Kingdom

Official Secrets Act 1889 (Note: Section 10.)
- Act of Parliament
- Parliament of the United Kingdom
- Long title: An Act to prevent the Disclosure of Official Documents and Information.
- Citation: 52 & 53 Vict. c. 52
- Territorial extent: United Kingdom (Note: Section 6.)

Dates
- Royal assent: 26 August 1889
- Commencement: 26 August 1889 (Note: Acts of Parliament (Commencement) Act 1793)
- Repealed: 22 August 1911
Other legislation
Amends	Criminal Jurisdiction Act 1802
Amended by	Costs in Criminal Cases Act 1908
Repealed by	Official Secrets Act 1911

Status: Repealed

Text of statute as originally enacted

The Official Secrets Act 1889 (52 & 53 Vict. c. 52) was an act of the Parliament of the United Kingdom. It created offences of disclosure of information (section 1) and breach of official trust (section 2).

The Official Secrets Bill began its parliamentary procedures on 10 May 1888, achieving its royal assent on 26 August 1889. It was initiated by Lord George Hamilton PC First Lord of the Admiralty and Edward Stanhope (PC) Secretary of State for War. The bill was enacted by the Attorney General Richard Webster to give increased powers against offences of disclosing confidential matters by officials, and to prevent the disclosure of such documents and information by spies, and/or to prevent breaches of official trust, in order to punish such offences of obtaining information and communicating it, against the interests of the British state.

== Subsequent developments ==
The whole act was repealed by section 13(2) of the Official Secrets Act 1911 (1 & 2 Geo. 5. c. 28), which came into force on 22 August 1911.

== See also ==
- Official Secrets Act
- Official Secrets Act 1911
- Official Secrets Act 1920
- Official Secrets Act 1939
- Official Secrets Act 1989
