= Official Secrets Act 1972 =

Parliament of Malaysia
- Long title: An Act to revise and consolidate the law relating to the protection of official secrets.
- Citation: Act 88
- Territorial extent: Malaysia
- Passed by: Dewan Rakyat
- Passed: 14 August 1972
- Passed by: Dewan Negara
- Passed: 5 September 1972
- Royal assent: 26 September 1972
- Commenced: 30 September 1972
- Effective: 1 October 1972

Legislative history

First chamber: Dewan Rakyat
- Bill title: Official Secrets Bill 1972
- Bill citation: D.R. 38/1972
- Introduced by: Mohamed Yaacob, Deputy Minister of Home Affairs
- First reading: 8 August 1972
- Second reading: 11 August 1972
- Third reading: 14 August 1972

Second chamber: Dewan Negara
- Bill title: Official Secrets Bill 1972
- Bill citation: D.R. 38/1972
- Member(s) in charge: Mohamed Yaacob, Deputy Minister of Home Affairs
- First reading: 4 September 1972
- Second reading: 5 September 1972
- Third reading: 5 September 1972

Amends
- Finance Companies Act 1969 [Act 6]

Amended by
- Banking Act 1973 [Act 102] Bank Simpanan Nasional Act 1974 [Act 146] Malaysian Currency (Ringgit) Act 1975 [Act 160] Criminal Procedure (Amendment and Extension) Act 1976 [Act A324] Banking and Borrowing Companies (Amendment) Act 1979 [Act A454] Official Secrets (Amendment) Act 1984 [Act A573] Official Secrets (Amendment) Act 1986 [Act A660] Banking and Financial Institutions Act 1989 [Act 372]

Related legislation
- Official Secrets Ordinance 1950 of the States of Malaya [F.M. 15 of 1950] Official Secrets Ordinance of Sabah [Cap. 90] Official Secrets Acts 1911 and 1920 of the United Kingdom; Official Secrets Ordinance of Sarawak [Cap. 63]

Keywords
- Classified information, confidential, official secret, restricted, secret, top secret, espionage, informant
- Status: In force

The Official Secrets Act 1972 (Malay: Akta Rahsia Rasmi 1972, abbreviated OSA), is a statute in Malaysia prohibiting the dissemination of information classified as an official secret. The legislation is based on the Official Secrets Act of the United Kingdom. After criticism of the act for lacking clarity, it was amended in 1986.

== Provisions ==
The act defines an "official secret" as:

...any document specified in the Schedule and any information and material relating thereto and includes any other official document, information and material as may be classified as 'Top Secret', 'Secret', 'Confidential' or 'Restricted', as the case may be, by a Minister, the Menteri Besar or Chief Minister of a State or such public officer

The Schedule to the Act covers "Cabinet documents, records of decisions and deliberations including those of Cabinet committees", as well as similar documents for state executive councils. It also includes "documents concerning national security, defence and international relations".

== Criticism ==
The act has been criticised for ostensibly stifling dissent and reducing transparency in government workings. One statesman has suggested that the act has turned the press into "an alternative Government Gazette". In addition, the usage of the act to classify documents which "cannot by any stretch of the imagination be reasonably confidential or secret" has been criticised.

== Structure ==
The Official Secrets Act 1972, in its current form (1 January 2006), consists of 31 sections and 1 schedule (including 9 amendments), without separate Part.

- Section 1: Short title
- Section 2: Interpretation
- Section 2A: Addition, deletion or amendment of the Schedule
- Section 2B: Appointment of public officer to classify official document, etc.
- Section 2C: Declassification of official secret by a Minister or a public officer
- Section 3: Penalties for spying
- Section 4: Prohibition of taking or making any document, measurement, sounding or survey of or within a prohibited place
- Section 5: Penalty for making or assisting in making false declarations or statements in obtaining permits
- Section 6: Special power of the court to direct search and seizure
- Section 7: Prohibition from carrying photographic apparatus
- Section 7A: Duty to report request for information, etc.
- Section 7B: Placing in confidence of foreign agent
- Section 8: Wrongful communication, etc. of official secret
- Section 9: Unauthorized use of uniforms, falsification of reports, forgery, personation and false documents
- Section 10: Interfering with police officers or members of the armed forces
- Section 11: Duty to give information
- Section 12: Power to require the production of messages
- Section 13: Harbouring
- Section 14: Attempts, incitements, etc.
- Section 15: Restrictions on prosecutions
- Section 16: Burden of proof and presumptions
- Section 16A: Certificate by a public officer to be conclusive evidence
- Section 17: Communications with foreign agents to be evidence of commission of certain offences
- Section 17A: Defence available to a public officer
- Section 18: Power to arrest
- Section 19: Powers of search and seizure
- Section 20: Special powers of investigation
- Section 21: Admission of statements in evidence
- Section 22: Evidence of accomplice
- Section 23: Examination of offenders
- Section 24: Protection of informers
- Section 25: Liability for offences outside Malaysia
- Section 26: Trial of offences
- Section 27: Exclusion of public during proceedings
- Section 28: Criminal liability of corporation or firm
- Section 29: Minister may confer police powers on suitable persons
- Section 30: Powers under Criminal Procedure Code not restricted
- Section 30A: Regulations
- Section 31: Repeal
- Schedule

== See also ==
- Official Secrets Act
