= Annie Machon =

Former MI5 intelligence officer, author, and public speaker

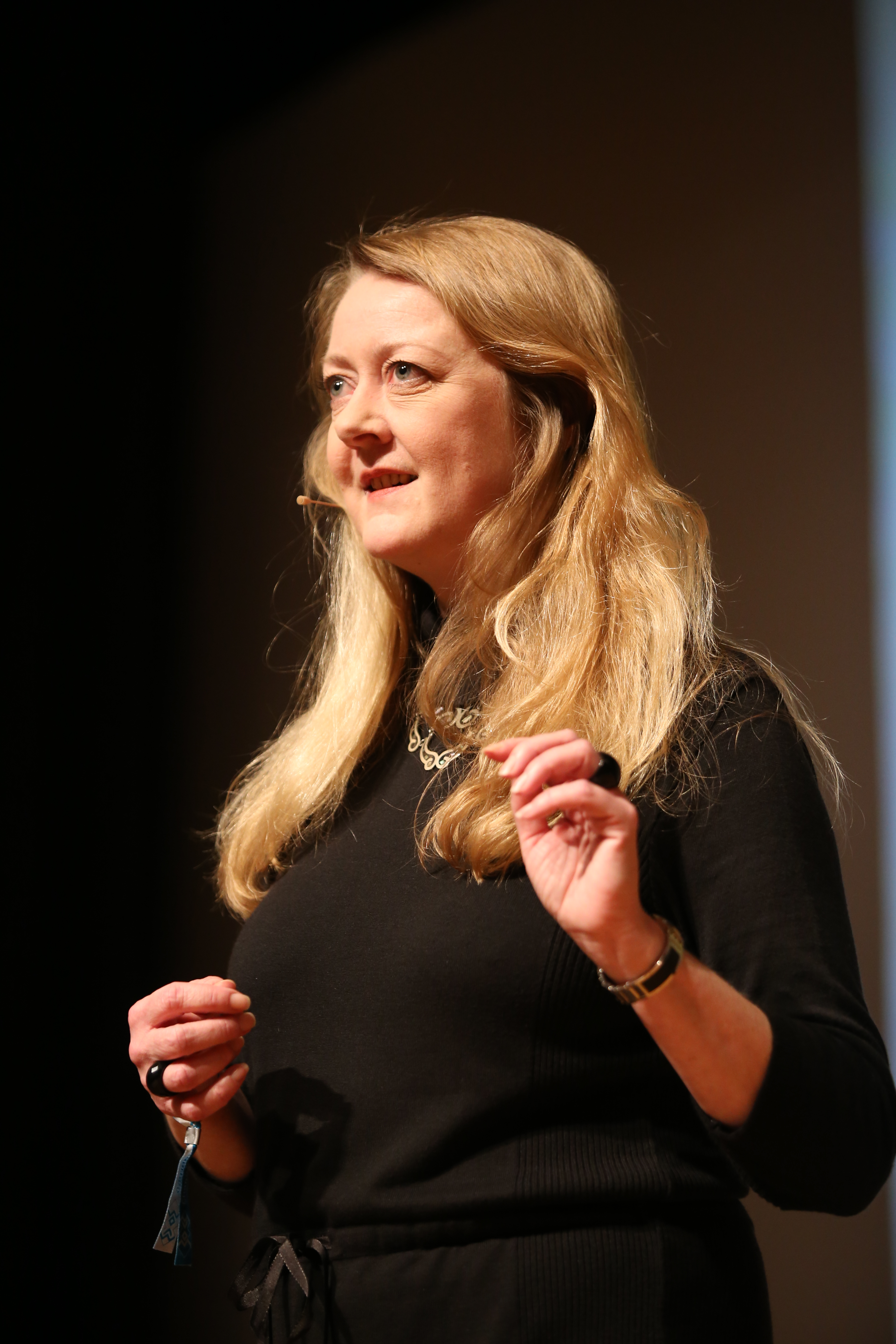
- Machon in 2013
- Born: 1968 (age 57–58); United Kingdom
- Education: Girton College, Cambridge
- Occupations: Author; public speaker
- Known for: Whistleblowing

Annie Machon (/ˈmæˌʃɒn/; born 1968) is a former British MI5 intelligence officer, author, and public speaker. In 1996, she resigned from MI5 in order to help David Shayler reveal a series of alleged crimes committed by the agency. Afterward, they went on the run around Europe for a month, lived in hiding for a year and in exile for two, before returning voluntarily. Machon was never charged with a crime. Subsequently, she has become a media commentator, author, political campaigner, and international public speaker on a wide variety of geopolitical issues. She has also featured in a number of films and TV documentaries, including The Culture High, Digitale Dissidenten, and The Mole: Undercover in North Korea.

== Early life and MI5 ==
Born in 1968, the daughter of a former pilot who became a Guernsey newspaper editor, Machon won a scholarship to a private school and then read classics at Girton College, Cambridge. After her graduation, she worked for a small publisher.

In 1990, Machon sat a Foreign Office examination to become a diplomat but was recruited by MI5, where she was posted to their counter-subversion department, officially known as 'F2'.

One year after joining the service, she met David Shayler and they became a couple. Machon said she and Shayler were "trying to track down old communists, Trotskyists, and fascists, which to us seemed like a waste of time". During the 1992 general election, she and Shayler provided summaries of the files of "anybody who stood for parliament". They were both "horrified by the scale of the investigations" and "argued most vociferously that we shouldn't be doing this". Two years later, she and Shayler moved to 'T' Branch, investigating Irish terrorism.

== Resignation and whistleblowing ==
In October 1996, Machon and Shayler resigned from the service with the intention to blow the whistle on a series of alleged crimes committed by the service, such as secret MI5 files held on the government ministers responsible for overseeing the intelligence services, illegal MI5 phone taps, lying to the government by MI5, IRA bombs that could have been prevented, the 1994 bombing of the Israeli embassy in London, and the attempted Secret Intelligence Service assassination of Muammar Gaddafi of Libya.

Shayler took classified documents to The Mail on Sunday. The first story, published on 24 August 1997, concerned the allegation of widespread spying on so-called subversives including Peter Mandelson, whose telephone had been bugged for three years, and other government ministers. A court injunction prevented claims about what the security services knew about the IRA from being revealed. The couple claimed the British government had been involved in an assassination attempt against colonel Muammar Gaddafi and that the security services had foreknowledge of the 1994 London Israeli Embassy bombing and the IRA's City of London bombing.

After they resigned, Shayler and Machon went on the run around Europe for a month. Machon then returned to London to face arrest but was never charged with any crime. She then returned to France and lived with Shayler in a rural area for a year. In July 1998, Shayler worked with BBC Panorama, The Sunday Times, and The Mail on Sunday to reveal what became known as the Gaddafi assassination plot in 1996. Due to British issues and urgent requests for extradition under the terms of the Official Secret Act, Shayler was imprisoned in Paris for almost four months, awaiting the hearing. France declined the extradition on the basis that whistleblowing was a political act. Shayler and Machon lived in Paris for two years and then returned to the UK in August 2000 for Shayler to stand trial.

Shayler was imprisoned for six months in November 2002 for offences contravening the Official Secrets Act. The trial judge said Shayler should thank Machon for helping to quash the claim in her evidence that Shayler had copied secret documents to begin a career in journalism. Machon did not face any criminal action herself.

In a 2006 interview with New Statesman magazine, Machon and Shayler both discussed their roles in the 9/11 truth movement, and she was quoted as saying, "The Pentagon's anti-missile defence system would definitely have picked up and dealt with a commercial airliner. We can only assume that whatever hit the Pentagon was sending a friendly signal. A missile fired by a US military plane would have sent a friendly signal."

== Later activities ==
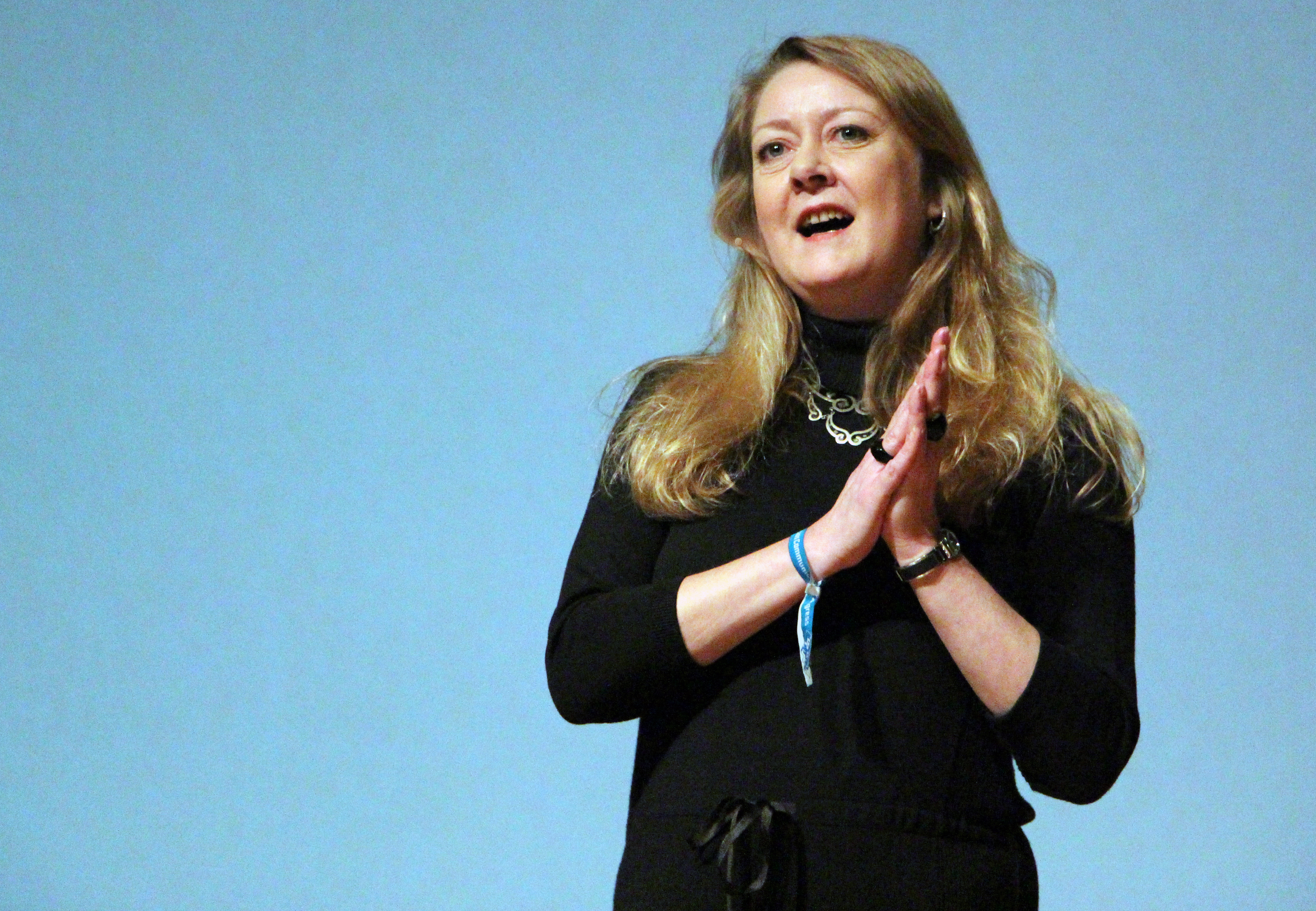
Machon at 30C3 in Hamburg, December 2013

Starting in 2007, Machon became involved in campaigning around privacy, surveillance, and intelligence issues, first speaking on these subjects at the 24th Chaos Communication Congress, organised by the Chaos Computer Club in 2007. Machon stated in 2010 that she believed Princess Diana was killed by British intelligence, partly because she was about to start campaigning for Palestinian rights.

Since then, she has continued to address these topics at a wide range of fora. For example, in 2013, she addressed the European Parliament Committee on Civil Liberties, Justice and Home Affairs on the topic of electronic mass surveillance of EU citizens.

From 2012 until 2016, Machon served as the European director of the Law Enforcement Action Partnership, a nonprofit organisation consisting of current and former police officers, judges, prosecutors, and other criminal justice professionals who use their expertise to advance drug policy and criminal justice solutions to enhance public safety.

In 2020, she received the Sam Adams Award for Integrity in Intelligence.

In October 2021, Machon spoke at the Belmarsh Tribunal in opposition to the US request to extradite Julian Assange.

== Bibliography ==
- Machon, A. (2005). Spies, Lies and Whistleblowers: MI5 and the David Shayler Affair. Book Guild Ltd.; ISBN 1-85776-952-X
- Machon, A. (2022). The Privacy Mission: Achieving Ethical Data for Our Lives Online. Wiley; ISBN 978-1-119-90697-1
