= Al Jazeera bombing memo =

Memo scandal between George Bush & Tony Blair

The Al Jazeera bombing memo is an unpublished and unverified memorandum made within the British government which is said to be the minutes of a discussion between United States President George W. Bush and Prime Minister Tony Blair. The Daily Mirror published a story on its front page on 22 November 2005 that said the memo quotes Bush speculating about a US bombing raid on Al Jazeera's world headquarters in the Qatari capital Doha and other locations. The story said that Blair persuaded Bush to take no action.

== Details of the memo ==
The five-page memorandum is said by the Mirror to be a record of the meeting between the two leaders which took place on 16 April 2004 at the height of Operation Vigilant Resolve, an assault on Fallujah by U.S. Marines and Iraqi security forces. Al Jazeera reporters were in the city providing video footage of the conflict. The day before the meeting, U.S. Defense Secretary Donald Rumsfeld described Al Jazeera's coverage as "vicious, inaccurate and inexcusable." Al Jazeera reporters defended their live broadcasts of the civilian casualties by stating "the pictures do not lie".

The White House dismissed the allegations made in the article. Given that Qatar is an ally of the United States and the United Kingdom in the Iraq War, many commentators speculated that even if the reports of the memorandum were accurate, they may simply have been recording a statement which the President did not intend to be taken seriously. A White House official told CNN "We are not going to dignify something so outlandish with a response," and a Pentagon official called the Daily Mirror report "absolutely absurd". A BBC News correspondent has suggested that if President Bush did indeed make the comments they were intended as "some kind of joke."

Writing in The Independent on 28 November Andreas Whittam Smith countered, observing that "official note takers don't normally record jokes". He also pointed to the alleged leaker's "25 years' experience of tough postings in place such as Islamabad and Khartoum, ... often involved in intelligence work" and concluded that he "must have felt exceptionally troubled by what he was seeing."

According to a report in The Daily Telegraph: "People who have seen the document say the real reason that it is being suppressed by the Government is because it contains a potentially damaging private discussion between the two leaders about the controversial United States attack on the Iraqi city of Fallujah last year." The report also stated that, when questioned about the matter at the Commonwealth conference in Malta, Blair branded the claims a "conspiracy theory."

== Official secrets and UK publication ban ==
A logo used by dozens of websites, to indicate their willingness to publish the memo.

David Keogh, a civil servant at the Cabinet Office, and Leo O'Connor, a research assistant to former Labour MP Tony Clarke, were charged respectively under Section 3 and 5 of the Official Secrets Act 1989 for the unauthorised disclosure of the memo. When O'Connor gave the memo to Clarke, Clarke returned it to Downing Street. All news organisations in the United Kingdom have been warned by Attorney General Lord Goldsmith against further publication of information from the leaked memo; Goldsmith has mentioned the possibility of prosecution under section 5 of the Official Secrets Act 1989 if published details from the memorandum are considered to damage interests of the United Kingdom abroad. On 29 November 2005, Keogh and O'Connor appeared at Bow Street Magistrates' Court in Central London. Following a 15-minute hearing the case was adjourned until 10 January 2006. On 10 May 2007, Keogh was found guilty on two counts of making a "damaging disclosure" by revealing the memo and was sentenced to 6 months in jail. He was also ordered to pay £5,000 in costs to the prosecution. O'Connor was sentenced to 3 months in jail.

Boris Johnson, then Conservative MP for Henley, editor of The Spectator and a supporter of the war, has stated that he will publish the memorandum if he receives a copy of it in the hope it will put speculation about what Bush may or may not have actually said to rest. Ian Hislop, editor of Private Eye, made a similar promise in an exchange with Johnson on the television show Have I Got News for You broadcast on 25 November.

The trial judge, Mr Justice Aikens in 9 October made an order under Section 11 of the Contempt of Court Act 1981, banning in perpetuity any connection in the UK media between the trial and Al Jazeera. "Any journalist will have to ensure in his own mind that they are not making an impermissible link", he said. There have been no U.K. reports linking the trial and remarks by David Blunkett on Channel 4 stating that "taking out" Al-Jazeera was discussed in a conversation with Tony Blair at the start of the Iraq war. Reporters Without Borders condemned the ban.

In an appeal against the ban, lodged by a group of UK media companies, Lord Chief Justice Lord Phillips partly lifted the ban. The UK media will now be able to repeat previously published allegations, but it will still be illegal to suggest that these allegations accurately represented evidence given in secret during the trial. It will also be illegal to print a particular phrase uttered in open court by Keogh when he was asked about the document.

== Previous U.S. bombings of Al Jazeera offices ==
Al Jazeera's offices have previously been hit by United States weaponry. On 13 November 2001 a U.S. missile hit Al Jazeera's office in Kabul, Afghanistan, during the U.S. invasion of that country. Although no Al Jazeera staff were hurt in the attack, the building was destroyed and some employees' homes were damaged. At the time, Mohammed Jasim al-Ali, managing editor, said that the coordinates of the office were well known to everyone including the Americans.

When former British Home Secretary David Blunkett published his memoirs in late 2006, it was revealed he had advised Prime Minister Tony Blair in late March 2003 to bomb the Al Jazeera television transmitter in Baghdad. "There wasn't a worry from me because I believed that this was a war and in a war you wouldn't allow the broadcast to continue taking place", Blunkett said.

On 8 April 2003 a U.S. missile hit an electricity generator at Al Jazeera's office in Baghdad. The resulting fire killed reporter Tareq Ayyoub and wounded another staff member. On 24 February, Mohammed Jasim al-Ali had sent a letter with the coordinates of the offices to Victoria Clarke, the U.S. Assistant Secretary of Defense for Public Affairs (the location had not been officially requested by the U.S. government). This incident, which occurred during the U.S. assault on Baghdad and after criticism of Al Jazeera's coverage from those supportive of the war aims of the United States forces, gave rise to suspicions that the network had been targeted.

Frank Gaffney published an opinion piece on 29 September 2003 calling for Al Jazeera to be "taken down" "one way or another" because it constitutes "enemy media".

== See also ==
- April 2003 journalist killings by the United States
- Destruction of the al-Jalaa building
