= Leo O'Connor =

Leo O'Connor may refer to:

- Leo O'Connor, British parliamentary researcher charged under the Official Secrets Act, see O'Connor–Keogh official secrets trial
- Leo O'Connor (cricketer) (1890–1985), Australian cricketer
- Leo O'Connor (hurler) (born 1966), Irish retired hurler
