= Public interest defence =

Legal defence

A public interest defence is a defence in law that allows a defendant who disclosed classified or protected information to avoid criminal or civil liability by establishing that the public interest in disclosure of the information outweighs the public interest in nondisclosure.

In the context of secrecy laws, it may permit a whistleblower to disclose government misconduct.

In the context of journalism, publication of a story that the journalist reasonably believes to be true "having regard for all the circumstances", even if subsequently found to be untrue, is protected against action for defamation in UK law.

In the United Kingdom, the Defamation Act 2013 provides a public interest defence.

== Official secrets ==
The inclusion of the defence was a subject of debate in the legislative process of the Official Secrets Act 1989 of the United Kingdom. The defence was not included in the final Act. The defence was also absent in secrecy laws in other countries that were based on the Act.

In Australia, the Public Interest Disclosure Act 2013 "provides a means to report suspected misconduct by public officials", setting out how such a disclosure must be done to qualify for protection.

Canada has reformed its secrecy laws in 2001 by adding the defence in its Security of Information Act. However, its application is limited to situations in which the defendant has followed a series of steps set out in the legislation before making the disclosure, and the person's purpose in making the disclosure is to reveal an offence committed by another person in their official duties.

The inclusion of the defence was a subject of debate in Hong Kong in 2003 during its legislative process to implement Article 23 of the Basic Law in the media in Hong Kong.

The US does not have a public interest defence. Edward Snowden, a NSA contractor who leaked classified documents in the public interest, said he will return to the US and stand trial if he is allowed a public interest defence. Snowden has been living abroad since 2013.

== See also ==
- Strategic lawsuit against public participation – Litigation to intimidate critics ("SLAPP")
- Lawfare, silencing opponents using legal methods
- Clive Ponting, British civil servant, charged with a breach of the Official Secrets Act but was acquitted by the jury, who accepted his public interest defence.
- Carole Cadwalladr, British journalist, whose public interest defence against a lawsuit alleging defamation was partially successful.
