= Anthony McCowan =

British judge

The Right Honourable Sir Anthony McCowan PC, QC

Justice of the High Court
- In office 1981–1989

Lord Justice of Appeal
- In office 1989–1997

Personal details
- Born: 12 January 1928 Georgetown, British Guiana (now Guyana)
- Died: 3 July 2003 (aged 75)
- Party: Conservative
- Education: Brasenose College, Oxford
- Profession: Barrister, Judge

Sir Anthony James Denys McCowan, PC, QC (12 January 1928 – 3 July 2003) was a British barrister and judge of the High Court of Justice and Court of Appeal best known for trying the case of Clive Ponting in 1985. After studying at Epsom College he won a scholarship to study history at Brasenose College, Oxford, where he switched to law, and he was called to the Bar in 1951. After gaining a strong practice in criminal, property and personal injury law he was made a Queen's Counsel in 1972, and was appointed a judge of the Queen's Bench Division of the High Court of Justice in 1981. In 1989 he became a judge of the Court of Appeal, but only sat for eight years until ill health forced him to retire in 1997. He died on 3 July 2003.

== Early life, education and work as a barrister ==
McCowan was born on 12 January 1928 in Georgetown, British Guiana (now Guyana), the son of a magistrate. He won a scholarship to study at Epsom College, starting there in 1940.

At Epsom, he won a scholarship to study history at Brasenose College, Oxford, before switching to law. In 1951 he helped found the Bow Group and was called to the Bar by Gray's Inn as an Atkin Scholar. After a pupillage with Stanley Rees at 1 Crown Office Row, McCowan specialised in criminal, property and personal injury law, practising in London and on the South East Circuit, and became noted for his skill at cross-examination. In 1971, he became a Recorder, He became a Queen's Counsel (QC) in 1972, and leader of the South Eastern Circuit in 1978, having been appointed Deputy Chairman of the East Sussex Quarter Sessions in 1969.

== Judge ==
On 2 June 1981, he was appointed to the Queen's Bench Division of the High Court of Justice, and received the customary knighthood the following month. In 1982 he became a member of the Parole Board for England and Wales, and the same year joined the Crown Court Rule Committee. In 1985 he presided over the case of Clive Ponting, a British civil servant who had been charged with violating section 2 of the Official Secrets Act 1911 after leaking documents about the sinking of the ARA General Belgrano. Ponting's defence (that his actions were in the interests of the state, as they prevented Parliament from being misled) was rejected by McCowan, who summed up in favour of the prosecution, "the public interest is what the government of the day says it is" – nevertheless, the jury found Ponting not guilty. In 1986 McCowan became Presiding Judge of the South Eastern Circuit.

On 3 October 1989, McCowan was appointed to the Court of Appeal of England and Wales, and made a Privy Counsellor. As an Appeals judge he ordered an inquest into the death of Roberto Calvi, nicknamed God's Banker, and in 1991 was part of the panel that heard the appeal of the Maguire Seven. The same year he was made Senior Presiding Judge of England and Wales, a position he held until ill-health forced him to resign in 1995. He resigned from the Bench two years later, and died on 3 July 2003.

== Bibliography ==
- McCowan, Bruce (2005). "Lord Justice Sir Anthony McCowan (1928–2003)". Ayrshire Notes (30). Ayrshire Archæological & Natural History Society. ISSN 1474-3531.
