= List of statutory instruments of the United Kingdom, 1952 =

This is an incomplete list of statutory instruments of the United Kingdom in 1952.

== Statutory instruments ==
=== 1-499 ===
- Trading with the Enemy (Authorisation) (Germany) Order 1952 (SI 1952/4)
- Trading with the Enemy (Transfer of Negotiable Instruments, etc.) (Germany) Order 1952 (SI 1952/5)
- Lands Tribunal (Statutory Undertakers Compensation Jurisdiction) Order 1952 (SI 1952/161)
- Reserve and Auxiliary Forces (Industrial Assurance and Friendly Societies) (Channel Islands) Order 1952 (SI 1952/165)
- Reserve and Auxiliary Forces (Industrial Assurance and Friendly Societies) (Isle of Man) Order 1952 (SI 1952/166)

=== 500-999 ===
- Barnsley Water Order 1952 (SI 1952/531)
- Distribution of German Enemy Property (No. 2) (Consolidated Amendment) Order 1952 (SI 1952/633)
- Double Taxation Relief (Taxes on Income) (Burma) Order 1952 (SI 1952/751)
- Japanese Treaty of Peace Order 1952 (SI 1952/862)
- Trading with the Enemy (Enemy Territory Cessation) (Belgium) Order 1952 (SI 1952/880)
- Superannuation (Fire Brigade and other Local Government Service) Interchange Rules 1952 (SI 1952/936)
- Superannuation (English Local Government and Northern Ireland) Interchange Rules 1952 (SI 1952/937)
- Veterinary Surgeons (University Degrees) (London) Order of Council 1952 (SI 1952/959)

=== 1000-1499 ===
- Official Secrets (Jersey) Order in Council 1952 (SI 1952/1034)
- Transferred Undertakings (Pensions of Employees) (No. 1) Regulations 1952 (SI 1952/1159)
- Double Taxation Relief (Taxes on Income) (Guernsey) Order 1952 (SI 1952/1215)
- Double Taxation Relief (Taxes on Income) (Jersey) Order 1952 (SI 1952/1216)
- Consular Conventions (Kingdom of Sweden) Order 1952 (SI 1952/1218)
- Coal Industry Nationalisation (Superannuation) Regulations 1952 (SI 1952/1233)
- Trading with the Enemy (Enemy Territory Cessation) (Indonesia) Order 1952 (SI 1952/1246)

=== 1500-1999 ===
- Cremation Regulations 1952 (SI 1952/1568)
- Veterinary Surgeons (University Degrees) (Edinburgh) Order of Council 1952 (SI 1952/1602)
- Transferred Undertakings (Pensions of Employees) (No. 2) Regulations 1952 (SI 1952/1612)
- Factories (Testing of Aircraft Engines and Accessories) Special Regulations 1952 (SI 1952/1689)
- Guildford, Godalming and District Water Board Order 1952 (SI 1952/1703)
- British Transport Commission (Executives) Order 1952 (SI 1952/1726)
- Marriage (Authorised Persons) Regulations 1952 (SI 1952/1869)
- Wireless Telegraphy (Isle of Man) Order 1952 (SI 1952/1899)
- Wireless Telegraphy (Channel Islands) Order 1952 (SI 1952/1900)

=== 2000- ===
- Trading with the Enemy (Enemy Territory Cessation) (Denmark) Order 1952 (SI 1952/2012)
- Coal Industry (Superannuation Scheme) (Winding Up, No. 4) Regulations 1952 (SI 1952/2018)
- Wireless Telegraphy (Control of Interference from Ignition Apparatus) Regulations 1952 (SI 1952/2023)
- Trading with the Enemy (Enemy Territory Cessation) (Luxembourg) Order 1952 (SI 1952/2067)
- Carriage of Goods Coastwise Regulations 1952 (SI 1952/2225)

== See also ==
- List of statutory instruments of the United Kingdom
