= David Shayler =

Former British MI5 officer

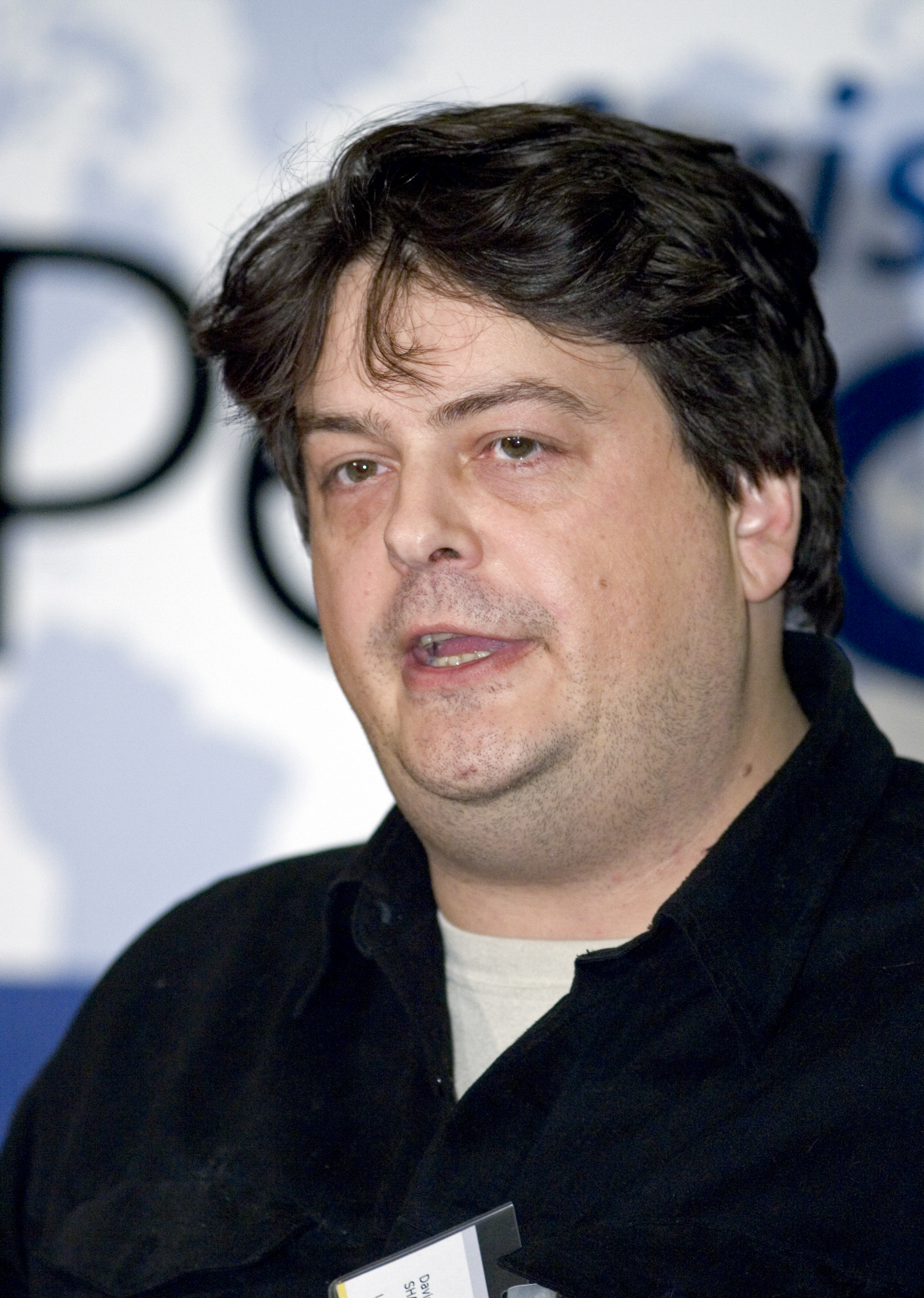
- Born: 24 December 1965 (age 60); Middlesbrough, England
- Employer: MI5
- Known for: Whistleblower

David Shayler (born 24 December 1965) is a former British MI5 officer and a whistle-blower. Shayler was prosecuted under the Official Secrets Act 1989 for passing secret documents to The Mail on Sunday in August 1997 that alleged that MI5 was paranoid about socialists, and that it had previously investigated Labour Party ministers Peter Mandelson, Jack Straw and Harriet Harman.

== Early life ==
Shayler was born in Middlesbrough, England. When he was ten, his family left Yorkshire. He attended John Hampden Grammar School in High Wycombe, Buckinghamshire whose head teacher, according to Shayler herself, once described him as "a born rebel who sails close to the wind ... and suffers neither fools nor their arguments gladly". Beginning in 1984, Shayler attended the University of Dundee where he was editor of the student newspaper Annasach and was responsible for publishing extracts of the book Spycatcher by another former MI5 officer Peter Wright (banned in Britain at the time). He graduated with a 2:1 (2nd class honours upper division) degree in English in July 1989. After leaving university, he worked as a journalist at The Sunday Times newspaper; his employment was terminated six months later.

== MI5 career ==
Shayler joined MI5 in October 1991 after responding to an oblique job advertisement in the 12 May edition of The Observer titled "Godot isn't coming", a reference to the play Waiting for Godot in which Godot never arrives. The advert asked if applicants had an interest in current affairs, had common sense and an ability to write. Believing the job was media-related, Shayler applied.

He started work in F branch, which dealt with counter-subversion, including the monitoring of left-wing groups and activists, where he worked vetting Labour Party politicians prior to the 1992 election, later being transferred to T branch, which handled Irish terrorism, in August 1992. Shayler moved again, to G9 branch, responsible for Middle Eastern terrorism, where he reportedly headed the Libyan desk as G9A/5. It was during his tenure at the Libyan desk that he claims that he learned of the MI6 plot to assassinate Libyan leader Muammar Gaddafi from his MI6 counterpart David Watson (PT16B) and Richard Bartlett (PT16) who had overall control and responsibility for the operation. He left the service in October 1996.

== After MI5 ==
Shayler stated that MI6 had been involved in a failed assassination attack on Libyan leader Muammar Gaddafi in February 1996 without the permission of the then foreign secretary Malcolm Rifkind. The plot involved paying the Libyan Islamic Fighting Group with supporters in London and links to Al-Qaeda, £100,000 to carry out the attack. The group was paid to plant a bomb underneath Gaddafi's motorcade. The attack happened in March 1996 in Gaddafi's native Sirte, a coastal city. The bomb was planted under the wrong car and failed to kill Gaddafi but did result in the deaths of several innocent civilians. In November 1999 he sent a dossier of detailed evidence of this including the names of those involved to then home secretary Jack Straw who stated that "he was... ...looking into the matter" as well as Parliament's Intelligence and Security Committee and the police. In 2005, the LIFG was banned as a terrorist group in Britain.

Shayler claimed the intelligence services were deliberately planting stories in newspapers and the mainstream media by feeding willing journalists with misinformation, such as a November 1996 article in The Sunday Telegraph by Con Coughlin linking Gaddafi's son with a currency counterfeiting operation, citing the source as a British banking official when in reality the source was MI6. This was later confirmed when Gaddafi's son served the paper with a libel writ which later admitted the true source of the information.

According to Shayler the 1994 bombing of the Israeli embassy in London was known to the intelligence services before it happened, and could have been prevented. The British government later placed an injunction on the republication of Shayler's claims although this was later lifted on 2 November 1997 allowing the paper to print his claims of how the attack could have been prevented if the service had acted on prior knowledge it had obtained. On 26 July 2000 he had an article published in Punch (magazine) that claimed the security service had information that could have prevented the 1993 Bishopsgate bombing.

After revealing information to The Mail on Sunday in August 1997, Shayler fled the day prior to publication, first to Utrecht in the Netherlands and then later to France with his girlfriend and former colleague Annie Machon. He was arrested by French police on 1 August 1998 with an extradition warrant on the request of the British government and then held in La Santé Prison for four months under the prisoner number 269151F. On 18 November 1998 the French courts determined the British government's extradition request was politically motivated and therefore not grounds for extradition. In 2000, Shayler appeared on Have I Got News for You via satellite, where he was the subject of a number of jokes.

== Return and trial ==
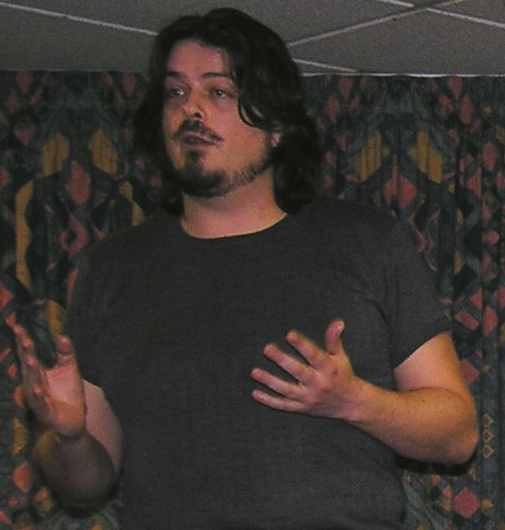
David Shayler talking at an anti-war meeting at Sheffield University in 2004

In August 2000, Shayler voluntarily returned to the UK on condition he was not remanded in custody pending his trial. He was arrested and subsequently released on bail. He was charged with three counts of breaching the Official Secrets Act 1989 on 21 September 2000, one charge of passing on information acquired from a telephone tap (a breach of Section Four of the Act), and two others of passing on information and documents obtained by virtue of his membership of the service (a breach of Section One of the Act). The judge at the trial was Alan Moses. At pre-trial hearings, he ruled that Shayler had to disclose all information and argument he intended to present to the jury to the judge and prosecution beforehand.

At the trial Shayler represented himself, claiming that the Official Secrets Act was incompatible with the Human Rights Act and that it was not a crime to report a crime; these arguments were dismissed by the court with the latter being ruled irrelevant. Shayler's defence attempted to argue that there were no other avenues to pursue his concerns with the service and its performance. The judge ruled that while this was true it was irrelevant. The judge instructed the jury to return a guilty verdict and that the House of Lords had ruled in another case that a defendant could not argue that he had revealed information in the public interest. After more than three hours of deliberation the jury found him guilty. In November 2002 he was sentenced to 6 months in prison, of which he served three weeks in Belmarsh prison and just under five weeks in Ford Open Prison, with the four months served on remand in France being taken into consideration. He was released on 23 December 2002, although he was electronically tagged and under a 7pm to 7am curfew for a further seven weeks.

== Lifestyle and beliefs ==
=== 9/11 truth movement ===
Following the release of the 9/11 Commission Report, David Shayler joined the 9/11 Truth movement, which maintains as its primary tenet the belief that the official explanation for the September 11, 2001 attacks is partly (or completely) fraudulent. Shayler claims the planes seen crashing into the World Trade Center were missiles wrapped in holograms, as well as saying that the attack on the Pentagon was not the result of a plane impact. He also alleged that this was part of a zionist conspiracy.

In February 2007, Shayler appeared in Ireland with Annie Machon and William Rodriguez.

=== Claims of divinity ===
Shayler speaks positively about David Icke, who has claimed to be the son of God: "David has done some enormously important work. I see him as the John the Baptist to my Christ. I have spoken to him on the phone and suggested we meet." Shayler has also claimed divinity himself. Shayler has said he is committed to destroying what he calls the "Zionist empire".

=== Gender identity ===
In an article in the London Evening Standard on 12 April 2012, Shayler further discussed the Messiah claim and revealed that he was living as a transvestite under the name Delores Kane in a squat at Hackhurst Farm in Abinger Hammer, Surrey. As of 2017 he was living under his original name of David Shayler, with Dolores described as his "alter ego."

== See also ==
- List of messiah claimants
- List of people claimed to be Jesus
- Messiah complex
