= Clive Ponting =

British civil servant and historian (1946–2020)

Clive Ponting OBE
- Born: Clive Sheridan Ponting; 13 April 1946; Bristol, England, UK
- Died: 28 July 2020 (aged 74); Kelso, Scotland, UK
- Occupation: Civil servant
- Known for: The General Belgrano papers
- Notable work: The Right to Know: The Inside Story of the Belgrano Affair
- Criminal charge: Section 2 Official Secrets Act 1911 (not guilty)
- Spouses: Katherine Hannan (m. 1969, divorced); Sally Fletcher (m. 1973, divorced); Laura Young (m. 1997, divorced); Diane Johnson (died 2020)

Clive Sheridan Ponting (13 April 1946 – 28 July 2020) was a senior British civil servant and historian. In 1984, he leaked classified documents about the sinking of the ARA General Belgrano in the Falklands War in 1982, which showed that government statements about the sinking were untrue. He was prosecuted under the Official Secrets Act, but argued that his actions were in the public interest, and was acquitted. At the time of his resignation from the civil service in 1985, he was a Grade 5 (assistant secretary), earning £23,000 per year (£70,214 in 2020).

He later wrote a number of books on British and world history. These included a Green History of the World (1991), which was revised as A New Green History of the World in 2007, and a biography of Winston Churchill (1994) and 1940: Myth and Reality (1990).

== Early life ==
Ponting was born in Bristol, the only child of Charles Ponting, who is thought to have worked in sales, and his wife, Winifred (née Wadham). He was educated at Bristol Grammar School and the University of Reading. He joined the civil service in 1970. While a Principal at the Ministry of Defence, he was appointed an Officer of the Order of the British Empire (OBE) in the 1980 Birthday Honours.

== Bureaucratic career ==
=== General Belgrano papers ===
While a senior civil servant at the United Kingdom's Ministry of Defence (MoD), Ponting sent two documents, subsequently nicknamed "the crown jewels", to Labour MP Tam Dalyell in July 1984 concerning the sinking of the Argentine navy warship General Belgrano, a key incident in the 1982 Falklands War. After Ponting admitted revealing the information, the Ministry of Defence suspended him without pay. On 17 August 1984, he was charged with a criminal offence under Section 2 of the Official Secrets Act 1911. The Prime Minister, Margaret Thatcher, had his pay reinstated once she had been briefed on what had happened. Ponting's defence at the trial was that the matter and its disclosure to a Member of Parliament were in the public interest. It was the first case under the Official Secrets Act that involved giving information to Parliament. Although Ponting expected to be imprisoned, he was acquitted by the jury. The acquittal came despite the judge's direction to the jury, and hence by definition a "perverse verdict". The judge, Sir Anthony McCowan, "had indicated that the jury should convict him", and had ruled that "the public interest is what the government of the day says it is".

In 1985, Ponting came across the one file about Operation Cauldron—1952 secret biological warfare trials that had led to a trawler being accidentally doused with plague bacteria off the Hebrides—that had not been destroyed, and confidentially told The Observer newspaper about it, leading to a story that July headlined "British germ bomb sprayed trawler".

Ponting resigned from the civil service on 16 February 1985. In May 1987, he made an extended appearance on the first edition of Channel 4's After Dark discussion programme, alongside among others including Colin Wallace, T. E. Utley and Peter Hain.

=== Charges under the Official Secrets Act ===
Shortly after his resignation, The Observer began to serialise Ponting's book The Right to Know: The Inside Story of the Belgrano Affair. The Conservative government reacted by amending the secrets legislation and by introducing the Official Secrets Act 1989. Before the trial, a jury could take the view that if an action could be seen to be in the public interest, the right of the individual to take that action might be justified. As a result of the 1989 modification, that defence was removed. After the enactment, it was taken that "'public interest' is what the government of the day says it is".

The events of Ponting's charge and trial were dramatised by Richard Monks on BBC Radio Four in May 2022.

== Academic career ==
Following his resignation from the Civil Service, Ponting served as a reader in the Department of Politics and International Relations at the University of Wales, Swansea, until his retirement in 2004. He was one of the pioneers of Big History.

His historical works have attracted attention from other academics, with scholar Paul Addison writing that "Ponting writes well and the clarity with which he summarises the issues calls to mind a model civil servant briefing his minister. He swoops like a hawk on the damning quotation or the telling statistic." C. J. Coventry reviewed Ponting's biography of Churchill, writing that "Ponting shattered the Churchill illusion for his readers leaving them little to piece together, just marble shards on the floor of his looted temple".

== Personal life ==
Ponting was married four times. In 1969, he married Katherine Hannan. After their divorce in 1973, he married Sally Fletcher, who also worked in the Ministry of Defence. Laura Young, a teacher, was his third wife, whom he married in 1997. His fourth wife, Diane Johnson, died in March 2020.

== Retirement ==
In November 2018, by then a resident of Kelso, Scottish Borders, Ponting gave a speech in which he warned fellow Scottish National Party members that a No-deal Brexit would be used as context in which to disband or constrain the Scottish Parliament.

Ponting died at home on 28 July 2020, at the age of 74.

== Works ==
- The Right to Know: The Inside Story of the Belgrano Affair (1985), Sphere Books, ISBN 0-7221-6944-2
- Whitehall - Tragedy and Farce (1986), Hamish Hamilton, ISBN 0-241-11835-2
- Breach of Promise - Labour in Power, 1964-70 (1989), Hamish Hamilton, ISBN 0-241-12683-5
- Whitehall: Changing the Old Guard, (1989), London, Unwin Paperbacks, The Fabian Series.
- 1940: Myth and Reality (1990), Hamish Hamilton, ISBN 978-0-241-12668-4
- A Green History of the World: The Environment and the Collapse of Great Civilizations (1991), Penguin, ISBN 0-14-017660-8
- Churchill (1994), Sinclair-Stevenson, ISBN 1-85619-270-9
- Armageddon - The Second World War (1995), Random House, ISBN 0-679-43602-2
- Progress and Barbarism: The World in the Twentieth Century (1998), Chatto & Windus, ISBN 1-85619-610-0; published in the US as The Twentieth Century: A World History (1999), Henry Holt & Co., ISBN 978-0-8050-6088-1
- World History - A New Perspective (2000), Chatto & Windus, ISBN 0-7011-6834-X.
- Thirteen Days - Diplomacy and Disaster, the Countdown to the Great War (2003), Pimlico, ISBN 0-7126-6826-8
- The Crimean War - The Story Behind the Myth (2004), Pimlico, ISBN 0-7126-6826-8
- Gunpowder - The Story (2005), Chatto & Windus, ISBN 0-7011-7752-7
- A New Green History of the World: The Environment and the Collapse of Great Civilizations (2007), Penguin, ISBN 0-14-303898-2 Penguin's description of the book

== See also ==
- Katharine Gun – British linguist, translator and whistleblower (born 1974) (formerly of GCHQ). Charged with breach of the Official Secrets Act, the case was dropped because the prosecution declined to offer evidence.
- Sarah Tisdall – FCO whistleblower (1983)
- Jury nullification – Type of jury verdict in criminal trials that occurs when the jury in a criminal trial gives a not guilty verdict, regardless of whether they believe a defendant has broken the law.

== Sources ==
- Norton-Taylor, Richard. The Ponting Affair. Cecil Woolf, 1985. ISBN 0-900821-73-6
