= National Security (State Threats) Act 2026 =

Act of the Parliament of the United Kingdom

National Security (State Threats) Act 2026 (Note: Section 8.)
- Act of Parliament
- Parliament of the United Kingdom
- Long title: An Act to make provision for the designation of bodies involved in foreign power threat activity; to create offences relating to bodies designated under this Act; and for connected purposes
- Citation: 2026 c. 24
- Introduced by: Shabana Mahmood; Lord Hanson of Flint
- Territorial extent: England and Wales; Scotland; Northern Ireland; (Note: Section 6.)

Dates
- Royal assent: 8 July 2026
- Commencement: 8 July 2026 (Note: Section 7(1).)
Other legislation
| Amends | Repatriation of Prisoners Act 1984; Criminal Justice Act 1988; Criminal Procedure (Scotland) Act 1995; Terrorism Act 2000; Criminal Justice Act 2003; Armed Forces Act 2006; Criminal Justice (Northern Ireland) Order 2008; Sentencing Act 2020; National Security Act 2023; Criminal Justice Act 2003 (Requisite and Minimum Custodial Periods) Order 2024 |

Status: Current legislation

Text of statute as originally enacted

Revised text of statute as amended

The National Security (State Threats) Act 2026 is an act of the Parliament of the United Kingdom. Its full description is "An Act to make provision for the designation of bodies involved in foreign power threat activity; to create offences relating to bodies designated under this Act; and for connected purposes." It introduces a new category of foreign state-controlled organisations which are illegal to support, assist or accept "material benefit" from.

The government has stated that the act will allow it to proscribe state-associated bodies not already covered by existing laws. The BBC suggested in June 2026 that the government might use it to proscribe organizations such as the Iranian Islamic Revolutionary Guard Corps.

Sir Ken McCallum, the Director General of the domestic counter-intelligence and security agency MI5 welcomed the introduction of the Bill, stating that it would build "on the important powers in the National Security Act 2023, which are already being heavily used" and "help us tackle the growing threat from proxy organisations, which are being increasingly used by states attempting to deniably target the UK".

At the time of its discussion as a bill in parliament, multiple media sources described it as a threat to journalism and humanitarian activities unless it was amended to prevent legitimate activities from being classified as illegally receiving "material benefit" from such organizations in the form of information.

== Passage ==
The bill was put before Parliament on 9 June 2026, sponsored by the Home Secretary Shabana Mahmood and Minister of State for the Home Office Lord Hanson of Flint. As of 2 July 2026 it was in the final stages of approval following its third reading in the House of Lords, before being put before the House of Commons for consideration of the Hourse of Lords' amendments on 6 July 2026. It received royal assent on 8 July 2026.

== Designations ==
So far designations under this act have been applied to the bodies shown in the table below.

Bodies designated under the National Security (State Threats) Act 2026
| Minister | Date | Group |
|---|---|---|
| Shabana Mahmood | 13 July 2026 | Islamic Revolutionary Guard Corps (IRGC) |
| Shabana Mahmood | 13 July 2026 | Islamic Movement of Companions of the Right (Harakat Ashab al-Yamin al-Islamia) |
| Shabana Mahmood | 13 July 2026 | GRU Volunteer Corps |

== See also ==
- National Security Act 2023
- Proxy war
