= 1994 London Israeli embassy bombing =

26 July 1994 car bombing of Israeli embassy building

1994 London Israeli Embassy bombing
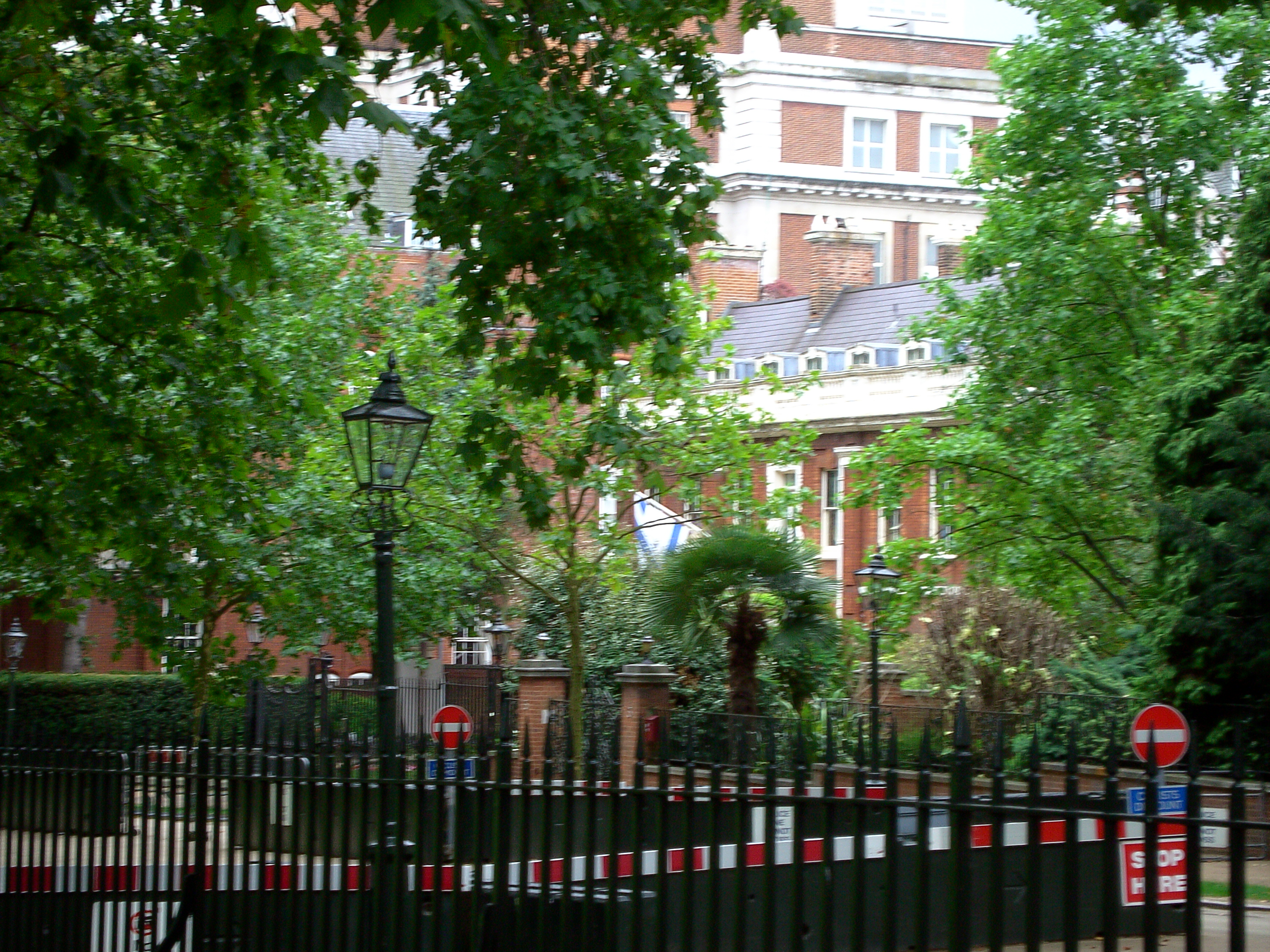
- Israeli embassy in London

- Location: 51°30′10.44″N 0°11′20.76″W; London, United Kingdom
- Date: 26 July 1994
- Target: Israeli embassy Balfour House
- Attack type: Car bomb
- Deaths: 0
- Injuries: 20
- Motive: Palestinian nationalism
- Convicted: Jawad Botmeh, Samar Alami

The 1994 London Israeli Embassy bombing was a car bomb attack on the Israeli embassy in Kensington, London, on 26 July 1994. The explosion injured twenty civilians and caused extensive damage to nearby buildings. A second bomb exploded several hours later outside Balfour House in Finchley, which housed the London offices of the United Jewish Israel Appeal (UJIA), injuring six people.

Two Palestinian engineers, Samar Alami and Jawad Botmeh, were later convicted of conspiracy to cause explosions in connection with the attacks.

== Background and attacks ==
On the morning of 26 July 1994, a car containing an estimated 20 to 30 pounds (9.1 to 13.6 kg) of explosives detonated outside the Israeli embassy in Kensington Palace Gardens, moments after the driver left the vehicle. The blast was heard over a mile away and shattered windows in nearby shops and residences. The attack occurred one day after a meeting in Washington, D.C., between King Hussein of Jordan and Israeli Prime Minister Yitzhak Rabin to discuss a peace treaty between their countries.

About thirteen hours later, a second car bomb exploded outside Balfour House in Finchley, the headquarters of the United Jewish Israel Appeal, a British Jewish charity. Six people were injured in that blast.

== Investigation ==
Initial suspicion focused on "pro-Iranian extremists, probably linked to the Lebanon-based Hezbollah group," according to statements from the Israeli ambassador and British intelligence analysts. Shortly after the first explosion, a group calling itself the Palestinian Resistance Jaffa Group claimed responsibility in letters sent to two Arab newspapers.

In January 1995, five Palestinians were arrested in London in connection with the attacks, leading to charges against two of them the following year.

== Convictions and appeals ==
In December 1996, two of the individuals arrested the previous year, Samar Alami—a Lebanese-Palestinian chemical engineer educated at University College London and Imperial College London—and Jawad Botmeh—a Palestinian electronics engineer educated at the University of Leicester and King's College London—were convicted at the Old Bailey of conspiracy to cause explosions related to the 1994 bombings. The prosecution did not allege that they planted the bombs but argued that they were part of a group involved in planning or supporting the attacks. Both admitted experimenting with homemade explosives, which they said were intended for demonstration purposes to be shared with Palestinians in the occupied territories. They were each sentenced to twenty years in prison and lost an appeal in 2001.

Amnesty International stated that Botmeh had been "denied his right to a fair trial." Campaigns supporting the pair were backed by the government of Palestine, the trade union Unison, lawyer Gareth Peirce, journalist Paul Foot, and the group Miscarriages of Justice UK (MOJUK). Five early day motions in the British Parliament gained support from 71 MPs, including Jeremy Corbyn, John McDonnell, Peter Bottomley, and Tom Brake.

In 2007, the European Court of Human Rights dismissed their appeal, ruling that their trial had not violated the right to a fair hearing.

== Allegations and controversy ==
In 1998, former MI5 officer David Shayler alleged that British security services had received an advance warning of a plan to attack the embassy but took no preventive action. The Crown Prosecution Service later confirmed a warning had been received, though it related to a different group than the one whose members were convicted. Then–Home Secretary Jack Straw stated that MI5 could not have prevented the attack based on the available intelligence. Shayler's allegations were referenced in Botmeh and Alami's appeal by their lawyer Michael Mansfield QC, who noted the type of explosive used in the bombing was unknown, and that Jack Straw had prevented disclosure of intelligence agency information.

Another former MI5 officer, Annie Machon, later said that an internal MI5 assessment concluded that the attack was conducted by Mossad in order to smear local Palestinian activists.

== Later developments ==
Botmeh was released from prison in 2008. He later worked as a researcher at London Metropolitan University, where he was briefly suspended in 2013 after being elected as a staff representative. Unison stated that the suspension was connected to his trade union activities. The decision was reversed the following month and he was reinstated.

== See also ==
- List of attacks against Israeli embassies and diplomats
- 2026 attack on Israeli consulate in Turkey
