= 1940: Myth and Reality =

1990 book by Clive Ponting

- Author: Clive Ponting
- Subject: World War II
- Publication date: 1990
- ISBN: 978-1566630368
- Dewey Decimal: 941.084
- LC Class: DA587

1940: Myth and Reality is a controversial 1990 book by British historian Clive Ponting. It is a revisionist history of World War II, particularly the United Kingdom in 1940 at the beginning of the war, and the divergences between the rhetoric and the reality in relation to popular British narratives of the Battle of Britain.

The historiography of the period is a contentious one: Ponting claims that underlying realities that are far more complex and troubling are masked by the notions of "Britain's finest hour" in the year of the Battle of Britain and the evacuation of Dunkirk, the other eulogising about the conflict and the lionisation of the premiership of Winston Churchill. The lesson of 1940 in particular, according to Ponting, was that Britain was no longer a superpower: "So vulnerable was Britain in the summer of 1940 that secret plans were laid to sell out Ulster to the Republic of Ireland and the Falklands (a nice touch, this) to Argentina. As the money ran out, the British forfeited their independence and became a client state of the United States".

Ponting also analyses the role of propaganda transmitted by the British government that also led to the creation of a façade that overstated underlying German casualty levels in the Battle of Britain (Note: Ponting gives the following examples: *On 15 September 1940, the Germans lost 60 aircraft whilst the British claimed 185. *For 16 August to 6 September 1940, the Germans lost 527 aircraft whilst the British claimed 855. *For 16 August to 6 September 1940, the British lost 343 aircraft whilst the BBC claimed 292. 1940: Myth and Reality, page 136.) and the parlous situation that led to Dunkirk. The question of the leadership of Churchill is examined and foreshadows Ponting's 1994 biography of Churchill, with the point made that the latter then addressed Parliament but rarely broadcast to the nation. The latter point has itself been contested, though the claim that an actor recorded Churchill's speeches has been found to be true.

The revisionism in 1940: Myth and Reality is different from that of, for example, The Battle of Britain: Myth and Reality, a 2000 book by British historian Richard Overy, and draws different (arguably more pessimistic) conclusions. The book caused a minor sensation when published, but few of the revelations were new, most having been published in other books in the previous 21 years.
