= GRU Volunteer Corps =

Organization controlled by the Russian GRU

The GRU Volunteer Corps (GRU VC) is a volunteer group controlled by the GRU, the foreign military intelligence agency of the General Staff of the Armed Forces of the Russian Federation tasked with advancing military intelligence through collecting and analyzing intelligence from around the world and conducting clandestine and covert operations. It has been proscribed by the British government as a national security threat under powers granted by the National Security (State Threats) Act 2026.

The GRU VC dates back to 2023, when Russian volunteer battalions fighting in Ukraine on behalf of the Russian government were reorganized under the GRU and the Russian Ministry of Defence. Since this time, it has also been used for activities outside Ukraine, including sabotage and espionage in the UK.
