= Criminal Jurisdiction Act 1802 =

Act of the Parliament of the United Kingdom

Criminal Jurisdiction Act 1802 (Note: The citation of this act by this short title was authorised by section 1 of, and the first schedule to, the Short Titles Act 1896. Due to the repeal of those provisions it is now authorised by section 19(2) of the Interpretation Act 1978.)
- Act of Parliament
- Parliament of the United Kingdom
- Long title: An Act for the trying and punishing in Great Britain Persons holding publick Employments, for Offences committed abroad; and for extending the Provisions of an Act passed in the Twenty-first Year of the Reign of King James made for the Ease of Justices and others in pleading in Suits brought against them, to all Persons, either in or out of this Kingdom, authorized to commit to safe Custody.
- Citation: 42 Geo. 3. c. 85
- Territorial extent: United Kingdom

Dates
- Royal assent: 22 June 1802
- Commencement: 22 June 1802 (Note: Section 1.)
Other legislation
Amends	Public Officers Protection Act 1623
Amended by	Statute Law Revision Act 1888; Official Secrets Act 1889; Public Works Loans Act 1892; Public Authorities Protection Act 1893; Perjury Act 1911; Criminal Justice Act 1948; Statute Law Revision Act 1964; Criminal Law Act 1967; Statute Law (Repeals) Act 1995

Status: Partially repealed

Text of statute as originally enacted

Revised text of statute as amended

Text of the Criminal Jurisdiction Act 1802 as in force today (including any amendments) within the United Kingdom, from legislation.gov.uk.

The Criminal Jurisdiction Act 1802 (42 Geo. 3. c. 85) is an act of the Parliament of the United Kingdom.

== Provisions ==
In the wake of the attempted impeachment of Warren Hastings, it legislated for the Court of King's Bench to try and punish past, present and future offences by colonial officials and military officers as if they had been committed in Middlesex, Westminster or any county where the offender resided (sections 1 and 6). It also enabled that court to obtain evidence from governors, local courts and others in the area where the offence occurred by writ of mandamus (section 2) and made other provisions for the gathering of that evidence (sections 3–4) as well as applying the usual perjury laws (section 5).

The act thus applied more widely the provisions of the Governors of Plantations Act 1698 (11 Will. 3. c. 12) and the East India Company Acts of 1772 and 1784.

== Subsequent developments ==
The act was later extended to offences under the Official Secrets Act 1889 (52 & 53 Vict. c. 52).

Part of sections 2–6 of the act were repealed for the United Kingdom by section 2 of Public Works Loans Act 1892 (55 & 56 Vict. c. 61).

Section 6 of the act to "Provided always that." was repealed by section 2 of, and the schedule to, the Public Authorities Protection Act 1893 (56 & 57 Vict. c. 61), which came into force on 1 January 1894.

In section 1 of the act, the words from " either upon an information " to " upon an indictment ", repealed for England and Wales by section 10(2) of, and part III of schedule 3 to, the Criminal Law Act 1967, which came into force on 1 January 1968.

Sections 2–6 of the act was repealed by section 1 of, and the schedule to, the Statute Law Revision Act 1964, which came into force on 31 July 1964.
