= William Gage (judge) =

British judge (1938–2023)

The Right Honourable Sir William Gage

Lord Justice of Appeal
- In office 2004 – 18 November 2008
- Succeeded by: Richard Aikens

Personal details
- Born: 22 April 1938
- Died: 13 September 2023 (aged 85)

Sir William Marcus Gage (22 April 1938 – 13 September 2023) was a British judge. He was a Lord Justice of Appeal from 2004 until 18 November 2008.

== Biography ==
William Marcus Gage was born on 22 April 1938. His father was Conolly Gage, a circuit judge. Like his father, William was educated at Repton School and Sidney Sussex College, Cambridge. He was a lieutenant in the Irish Guards during his national service.

Gage was called to the Bar in 1963 and took Silk in 1982. As a barrister, he defended Dr Ann Dally, who was disciplined by the General Medical Council for prescribing controlled drugs to addicts in the 1980s.

Gage was appointed a High Court Judge, Queen's Bench Division in 1993 and was presiding judge in the south-eastern circuit from 1997 to 2000. He received a knighthood in November 1993.

Cases he presided over include the Jill Dando murder case and the case against Sion Jenkins, a former deputy headmaster who was jailed for life in 1998 for the murder of his teenage foster daughter Billie-Jo.

After retirement, he chaired a public inquiry into the 2003 death of Baha Mousa. In his report, he condemned the use of banned interrogation methods after Mousa died of 93 injuries in British army custody in Basra, and deplored the absence of any "proper MoD doctrine on interrogation". He wrote "My judgment is that they constituted an appalling episode of serious, gratuitous violence on civilians which resulted in the death of one man and injuries to others. They represent a very serious breach of discipline by a number of members of 1QLR [1st Battalion, The Queen's Lancashire Regiment]."

Gage was appointed a Privy Counsellor in 2004, entitling him to the honorific The Right Honourable for life.

He was an honorary fellow of Sidney Sussex College until his death.

William Gage died of complications from vascular dementia on 13 September 2023, at the age of 85.
