= O'Connor–Keogh official secrets trial =

In November 2005, British civil servant David Keogh and parliamentary researcher Leo O'Connor were respectively charged with offences under Section 3 and 5 of the Official Secrets Act 1989 in the United Kingdom. Both men were of Northampton, England.

The charges against the pair relate to the alleged leak of a secret memo containing what purports to be a discussion between then British Prime Minister Tony Blair and United States President George W. Bush at April 2004. It was alleged this memo shows that Blair had to dissuade Bush from bombing Al Jazeera headquarters in Qatar.

They appeared on 29 November 2005 in the Bow Street Magistrates' Court in London. They were remanded on bail and to return to the court on 10 January 2006 for a committal hearing.

On 10 January 2006, Neil Clark, solicitor for O'Connor, was shown the memo and declared it posed no threat to national security. He vowed to have it made public by the court. The case returned to court on 24 January.

The trial was due to begin on 9 October 2006 before Mr Justice Aikens. However, on that date he ruled the hearing should be held in secret under Section 11 of the Contempt of Court Act 1981. It was then reported that the trial itself would begin on 18 April 2007.

In arguing for the trial to remain secret, the government claimed the memo "could have a serious impact upon the international relations" of the UK, and that the "risk is of such magnitude to outweigh the interest of open public justice."

The trial began on 18 April 2007 in the Old Bailey, with David Perry QC leading the prosecution. Keogh was represented by Rex Tedd QC, and O'Connor was represented by John Farmer. Elaborate procedures were imposed to ensure secrecy, including asking barristers to remove their wigs when restricted information was being discussed. Few details have been published in the press.

On 10 May 2007, Keogh was found guilty on two counts and was sentenced to 6 months' imprisonment. He was also ordered to pay £5000 in costs to the prosecution. O'Connor was found guilty on one count and was sentenced to 3 months' imprisonment.

== Initial BBC report challenged by Blairwatch blog ==
The original BBC report had claimed that the pair were actually being tried for leaking a different memo, called "Iraq: The Medium Term", which had been published by The Times in 2004. The popular blog BlairWatch argued that a report five days later in the Daily Mirror was in fact correct and that the BBC's source, a government spokesperson, had given the BBC a false story to divert attention from the Al Jazeera bombing memo. Subsequent mainstream news coverage confirmed that the charges concerned the Al Jazeera bombing memo.

== See also ==
- Al Jazeera bombing memo
