= Richard Aikens =

British judge

The Right Honourable Sir Richard Aikens

Lord Justice of Appeal
- In office 19 November 2008 – 2 November 2015
- Preceded by: Lord Justice Gage
- Succeeded by: Lord Justice Lindblom

Justice of the High Court
- In office 6 May 1999 – 19 November 2008

Personal details
- Born: 28 August 1948 (age 78)
- Education: St John's College, Cambridge

Sir Richard John Pearson Aikens PC (born 28 August 1948) is a retired British judge, who was a Lord Justice of Appeal from 2008 to 2015.

== Biography ==
Aikens was educated at Norwich School and St John's College, Cambridge, where he read history and law.

He was called to the Bar (Middle Temple) in 1973 and joined what is now Brick Court Chambers in 1974. He became a Queen's Counsel in 1986. He was appointed a Recorder in 1993, and a Bencher in 1994.

On 6 May 1999, Aikens was appointed to the High Court of Justice, receiving the customary knighthood, and was assigned to the Queen's Bench Division. He was a judge of the Commercial and Admiralty Courts from 1999 to 2008, and was in charge of the Commercial Court in 2005–06). He was chairman of the Commercial Court Long Trials Working Party in 2006. During his judicial career in the High Court, He was noted for presiding the O'Connor–Keogh official secrets trial, where on 9 October 2006 he ruled the hearing should be held in secret under Section 11 of the Contempt of Court Act 1981.

On 19 November 2008, Aikens became a Lord Justice of Appeal, and received the customary appointment to the Privy Council the same year. He retired on 2 November 2015. After retirement, Aikens rejoined Brick Court Chambers as a door tenant.

He is a visiting professor at Queen Mary University of London and King's College, London.

Aikens is a supporter of Brexit, writing "our ability to determine our own laws is picked apart by the EU and its unaccountable judges. For the future of our democracy, we should vote Leave". He co-authored a proposal with Guglielmo Verdirame and Professor George Yarrow for Britain to remain in the European Economic Area.

He is married with 2 sons and 2 step daughters. He is also a patron of the arts, serving as a director of the English National Opera 1995-2004, founder and President of the Temple Music Foundation, chairman of Music and Theatre For All, and as a trustee of the Razumovsky Ensemble and Academy.

== Books ==
- Bullen and Leake on Pleadings and Practice (13th edition, 1991)
- Bills of Lading (2006, 2nd edition 2015)
- Reforming Marine and Commercial Insurance Law (2008)
- Tom Bingham and the Transformation of the Law (2009) (book chapter) ISBN 9780199566181
- Law and Society: Which is to be Master (2011) (co-editor, preface and introductions) ISBN 9780854900886

== See also ==
- List of Lords Justices of Appeal
