= National Security Act 2023 =

Act of the Parliament of the United Kingdom

National Security Act 2023 (Note: Section 102.)
- Act of Parliament
- Parliament of the United Kingdom
- Long title: An Act to make provision about threats to national security from espionage, sabotage and persons acting for foreign powers; about the extra-territorial application of Part 2 of the Serious Crime Act 2007; for the registration of certain arrangements with, and activities of, specified persons and foreign powers; about the award of damages in proceedings relating to national security and the payment of damages at risk of being used for the purposes of terrorism; about the availability of legal aid to persons connected with terrorism; to amend the Terrorism Act 2000; and for connected purposes.
- Citation: 2023 c. 32
- Introduced by: Priti Patel, Home Secretary (Commons); The Lord Sharpe of Epsom, Parliamentary Under-Secretary of State for the Home Department (Lords)
- Territorial extent: England and Wales; Scotland; Northern Ireland; (Note: Section 98.)

Dates
- Royal assent: 11 July 2023
- Commencement: Various (Note: Section 100.)
Other legislation
Amends	Electoral Law Act (Northern Ireland) 1962; Representation of the People Act 1983; Police and Criminal Evidence Act 1984; Official Secrets Act 1989; Police and Criminal Evidence (Northern Ireland) Order 1989; Criminal Procedure (Scotland) Act 1995; Terrorism Act 2000; Political Parties, Elections and Referendums Act 2000; Armed Forces Act 2006; Serious Crime Act 2007; Protection of Freedoms Act 2012; Legal Aid, Sentencing and Punishment of Offenders Act 2012; Modern Slavery Act 2015; Investigatory Powers Act 2016; Counter-Terrorism and Border Security Act 2019; Sentencing Act 2020
Repeals/revokes	Official Secrets Act 1911; Official Secrets Act 1920; Official Secrets Act 1939
Amended by	Crime and Policing Act 2026; National Security (State Threats) Act 2026

Status: Amended

History of passage through Parliament

Text of statute as originally enacted

Revised text of statute as amended

The National Security Act 2023 (c. 32) is an act of the Parliament of the United Kingdom that introduced new measures intended to strengthen United Kingdom national security against espionage, interference in the political system, sabotage, and assassination.

In a press release, the government stated that "The new powers will help ensure that the UK remains the hardest operating environment for malign activity undertaken by foreign actors", quoting MI5 Director General, Ken McCallum as saying "The National Security Act is a game changing update to our powers. We now have a modern set of laws to tackle today’s threats."

The core measures put in place by the act came into force on 20 December 2023 and were described at the time as "the most significant reform of espionage law in a century".

The act repeals and replaces the Official Secrets Act 1911, Official Secrets Act 1920 and Official Secrets Act 1939.

== The act ==
The act introduces new offences relating to espionage, prohibited places, sabotage, foreign interference, obtaining benefit from foreign intelligence services, and new powers of arrest and detention and search and seizure. It also introduces a Foreign Influence Registration Scheme requiring the registration of arrangements for political influence activities in the UK directed by a foreign power.

=== Espionage ===
The act contains three offences relating to espionage: obtaining or disclosing protected information, obtaining or disclosing trade secrets, and assisting a foreign intelligence service.

The offence of obtaining or disclosing protected information replaces provisions in prior Official Secrets Acts, and increases the maximum sentence to life imprisonment from 14 years previously. The Ministry of Defence stated that former UK Armed Forces personnel training foreign militaries was an example of conduct which could involve "disclosing protected information" and would therefore constitute an offence under this section.

The new offence of obtaining or disclosing trade secrets relates to the disclosure to a foreign power of a UK trade secret (defined in s.2(2)). The maximum penalty is a term of imprisonment not exceeding 14 years and/or a fine.

The new offence of assisting a foreign intelligence service is committed where a person engages in conduct which is intended to or may materially assist a foreign intelligence service in carrying out UK-related activities. This offence was created to reduce the ability of foreign intelligence agencies to carry out hostile activities against the UK, extending beyond traditional espionage activity.

=== Prohibited places ===
New provisions relating to prohibited places strengthen existing legislation in this area. It includes provisions covering entering, inspecting or being in the vicinity of these places and includes use of unmanned drones, electronic hacking or other modern remote methods. Additional police powers are provided for ordering a person to cease their activity or move away from the place. Failure to comply with these police powers is an offence with a maximum penalty of three months imprisonment.

An example is given of "a person taking photographs of staff members as they enter or leave a prohibited place would commit the offence if they did so with a purpose that they knew, or ought reasonably to know, is prejudicial to the safety or interests of the United Kingdom".

As originally introduced, the bill did not include places owned, controlled or used for the functions of the Security Service, Secret Intelligence Service or GCHQ in the set of prohibited places. These were added when the bill was amended in the Public Bill Committee.

The Secretary of State has the power to designate additional sites as prohibited places through secondary legislation. This power has been used to designate places connected to the civil nuclear industry (including ships used to carry nuclear material) as additional prohibited places.

=== Sabotage ===
The act introduces a new offence of sabotage conducted for, or intended to benefit a foreign power, resulting in damage (including temporary damage) to any asset (tangible or intangible, including data and electronic systems) which is prejudicial to UK interests. It is intended to be a bespoke, modern offence to tackle state sponsored sabotage conducted against the UK. The offence carries a sentence of life imprisonment.

=== Foreign interference ===
The new offence of foreign interference aims to "create a more challenging operating environment for, and to deter and disrupt the activities of, foreign states who seek to undermine UK interests, our institutions, political system, or our rights, and ultimately prejudice our national security". Three conditions which must all be met in order for the prosecution to be successful are:

1. the accused person's conduct must be towards a certain goal;
2. the conduct must be in some way illegitimate, for example coercive behaviour;
3. the conduct must meet the "foreign power condition".

Activities "carried out for, or on behalf of, or intended to benefit, a foreign power" fall under this rubric. Foreign interference "is intended to sow discord, manipulate public discourse, discredit the political system, bias the development of policy, and undermine the safety or interests of the UK." There are also provisions targeting foreign interference in elections by increasing penalties for existing electoral offences when foreign interference is involved. The foreign interference offence carries a maximum sentence of 14 years.

=== Obtaining a material benefit from a foreign intelligence service ===
Two new offences relating to obtaining material benefits from a foreign intelligence service are introduced in section 17. The first is where a person obtains, accepts or retains a material benefit, and they knew, or ought reasonably to know, that this benefit was provided by or on behalf of a foreign intelligence service. The second offence is where a person agrees to accept (but does not receive) these material benefits. Where material benefits are obtained, the maximum sentence is 14 years, when they are merely accepted it is 10 years.

The purpose of this section is to allow prosecutions where a foreign intelligence service is providing a person with financial or other benefits, but where it is not possible to prove a link between the benefit provided and what the person has done – or is expected to do – in return, therefore making it difficult to prove that the person has committed an espionage offence.

=== Preparatory conduct ===
This is an offence which is committed when an individual engages in conduct in preparation for the commission of offences certain under other sections of the act – including the offences covering protected information, trade secrets, prohibited places or sabotage – plus other conduct intended to benefit a foreign state which involve serious violence, endangerment of life or serious risk to the public. Preparatory acts include where another person will commit the act itself.

A Home Office policy paper describes a military contractor with security clearance researching foreign diplomats in London, with the intention of sharing sensitive information in exchange for money, as a hypothetical example of a preparatory conduct offence.

== Provisions ==
=== Section 27 (Arrest without warrant) ===
Section 27 of the act provides the police with the power to arrest and detain (without a warrant) any person suspected to be involved in foreign power threat activity for up to 48 hours initially. This initial period can be extended by a court to a maximum of 14 days detention. In exceptional circumstances the maximum detention period can be extended to 28 days using emergency legislation.

A person detained under this section has a right to have a named person informed of their detention and to consult a solicitor. In specified circumstances (related to interference of an investigation) the exercise of these rights can be delayed. Biometric data collected during detention under this section can be retained for a maximum of 5 years in total, regardless of if a person is charged or acquitted.

=== Prevention and investigation measures ===
==== Section 39 ====
Section 39 provides the Secretary of State with the power to issue a notice putting in place restrictive measures to prevent a person's involvement in foreign power threat activity. These measures are described as "State Threats Prevention and Investigation Measures" (STPIMs) and their framework largely replicates the existing Terrorism Prevention and Investigation Measures (TPIMs).

==== Section 56 ====
Section 56 provides for an offence which is committed when an individual subject to a STPIM contravenes (without reasonable excuse) any measure specified in the notice. The maximum sentence for this offence is 5 years imprisonment. For breaching a measure preventing travel outside the United Kingdom a sentence of 10 years imprisonment can be imposed and the grounds of reasonable excuse are excluded.

==== Section 57 ====
This section makes provision for powers of entry, search, seizure and retention in relation to individuals subject to a STPIM. The powers allow for entry and search of an individual's premises and the individual themselves at the time of serving the STPIM notice. They also provide for further searches relating to suspicion of absconding, for compliance purposes and for public safety purposes.

In addition, a power to retain items allows for items found to be tested, retained and used as evidence. With the exception of searches for compliance purposes, no warrant is required.

==== Sch. 7 para. 12 ====
Individuals subject to an STPIM can be required by the Secretary of State to participate in polygraph sessions and information gained from these sessions can be shared with the intelligence services.

== Criticism ==
There were concerns about the impact of the bill on investigative journalism. Guy Black, deputy chair of Telegraph Media Group, told the House of Lords that he was concerned the draft legislation could “potentially criminalise” reporters and whistleblowers.

An amendment in the Lords to address journalistic concerns by adding "a defence to show that the person engaged in the conduct in question was acting with a view to publication of material by a recognised news publisher" was defeated by a majority of 130 votes. The government responded to concerns by modifying the wording of certain offences, including amendments to replace 'reasonably possibly may' with 'likely to', with the intention of clarifying the scope of offences.

The act has been criticised in Chinese media outlets, which claimed that it was comparable to or stricter than the Hong Kong national security law. Radio Free Asia, a news service funded by the United States government, characterised these claims as misleading for lacking wider context.

== Progress through Parliament ==
The bill was introduced as number 7 for the 2022-23 session, receiving its first reading on 11 May 2022 and royal assent on 11 July 2023.

== Commencement ==
Sections 95 to 102 came into force on royal assent (11 July 2023). Sections 1 to 64 and sections 92 to 94, and schedules 1 to 12, 17 and 18 came into force on 20 December 2023, except that the repeal of section 9(1) of the Official Secrets Act 1911 does not apply to offences committed before that date.

Sections 65 to 83 will come into force on 1 July 2025.

== Legal Cases ==
After coming into force the act has been used to more easily facilitate convictions in cases involving foreign intelligence services. Including a case where undercover British intelligence officers posed as a foreign intelligence service. It was also applied in a case involving a former MI5 contractor.

=== Russia directed arson ===
Dylan Earl and Jake Reeves were the first people to be convicted of offences under this act, for committing arson on behalf of Russia against a Ukrainian-owned London warehouse providing aid to Ukraine. The fire on 20 March 2024 caused £1.3m in damage. Earl was sentenced to 17 years in prison plus 6 years on extended licence, Reeves received 12 years in prison plus a year on extended licence. Four other men were also sentenced for their involvement, although not for offences under this act.

=== Hong Kong directed spying on dissidents ===
Chi Leung Wai and Chung Biu Yuen were jailed for spying on Hong Kong pro-democracy dissidents in the UK on behalf of China. Both were found guilty of assisting a foreign intelligence service. Wai worked as a Border Force officer and Yuen worked for the Hong Kong Economic and Trade Office in London, he was Wai's contact with Chinese authorities. Wai used his access to Home Office computer systems to track down pro-democracy dissidents. Both were convicted of assisting a foreign intelligence service, with Yuen given 8 years prison and Wai 6 years plus 4 additional years for misconduct in public office.

=== Alleged spying for China by political advisers ===
David Taylor, Matthew Aplin, and Steve Jones, are accused of assisting a foreign intelligence service. All have been involved with the Labour party as political advisers. They were released on bail after being arrested on suspicion of spying for China. Counter Terrorism Policing said they did not believe there to be "any imminent or direct threat" related to the arrests.

David Taylor is married to East Kilbride and Strathaven MP Joani Reid. Reid has stated that she is not under investigation herself, and that "As far as I am aware I have never met any Chinese businesses whilst I have been an MP, any Chinese diplomats or government employees, nor raised any concern with ministers or anyone else on behalf of, even coincidentally, Chinese interests."

=== First charges for activity overseas ===
Rashad Sultanov, is accused of carrying out "hostile surveillance" of the UK overseas military base RAF Akrotiri on behalf of the Islamic Revolutionary Guards Corps. He is being held by Cypriot police pending extradition to the UK where he is to be charged by Counter Terrorism Policing London for his actions between 11 May 2025 and 22 June 2025.

== See also ==
- Official Secrets Act 1989 – companion UK legislation.
- Official Secrets Act 1911 – repealed and replaced by the NSA 2023.
- Official Secrets Act 1920 – repealed and replaced by the NSA 2023.
- Official Secrets Act 1939 – repealed and replaced by the NSA 2023.
- Espionage Act of 1917 – equivalent US legislation.
- National Security (State Threats) Act 2026 – proposed law to create powers not enacted by existing legislation
