= Official Secrets Act 1939 =

Act of the Parliament of the United Kingdom

Official Secrets Act 1939 (Note: Section 2(1).)
- Act of Parliament
- Parliament of the United Kingdom
- Long title: An Act to amend section six of the Official Secrets Act 1920.
- Citation: 2 & 3 Geo. 6. c. 121
- Territorial extent: United Kingdom (Note: Section 2(2).)

Dates
- Royal assent: 23 November 1939
- Commencement: 23 November 1939 (Note: The Acts of Parliament (Commencement) Act 1793.)
- Repealed: 20 December 2023
Other legislation
Amends	Official Secrets Act 1920
Amended by	SR&O 1970/111
Repealed by	National Security Act 2023
Relates to	Official Secrets Act 1911

Status: Repealed

Text of statute as originally enacted

Revised text of statute as amended

The Official Secrets Act 1939 (2 & 3 Geo. 6. c. 121) was an act of the Parliament of the United Kingdom. It substituted a new section 6 into the Official Secrets Act 1920, which limited the scope of that offence to offences under section 1 of the Official Secrets Act 1911 (it had formerly applied to all offences under the Official Secrets Act 1911 and to all offences under that act).

It was enacted in reaction to the "Sandys affair" in 1938, when Duncan Sandys MP was threatened with prosecution under section 6 in an attempt to get him to disclose who had given him information about the inadequate state of the air defences around London.

The whole act was repealed by and replaced with the National Security Act 2023.

== See also ==
- Official Secrets Act

== Bibliography ==
- Halsbury's Statutes
