= Official Secrets Act 1989 =

Act of the Parliament of the United Kingdom

Official Secrets Act 1989 (Note: Section 16(1).)
- Act of Parliament
- Parliament of the United Kingdom
- Long title: An Act to replace section 2 of the Official Secrets Act 1911 by provisions protecting more limited classes of official information.
- Citation: 1989 c. 6
- Territorial extent: United Kingdom

Dates
- Royal assent: 11 May 1989
- Commencement: 1 March 1990 (Note: Section 16(3). The Official Secrets Act 1989 (Commencement) Order 1990.)
Other legislation
Amends	Official Secrets Act 1911; Official Secrets Act 1920; Bank of England Act 1946; Atomic Energy Authority Act 1954; Nuclear Installations Act 1965; Parliamentary Commissioner Act 1967; Post Office Act 1969; Parliamentary Commissioner Act (Northern Ireland) 1969; Commissioner for Complaints Act (Northern Ireland) 1969; Radiological Protection Act 1970; Social Security Act 1973; Local Government Act 1974; Local Government (Scotland) Act 1975; Social Security Pensions (Northern Ireland) Order 1975; Civil Aviation Act 1982; National Health Service Act 1977; Northern Ireland (Emergency Provisions) Act 1978; Civil Aviation Act 1982; National Audit Act 1983; Telecommunications Act 1984; Data Protection Act 1984; Police and Criminal Evidence Act 1984; Occupational Pension Schemes (Contracting out) Regulations 1984; Interception of Communications Act 1985; Occupational Pension Schemes (Contracting-out) Regulations (Northern Ireland) 1985; Audit (Northern Ireland) Order 1987
Amended by	Police and Criminal Evidence (Northern Ireland) Order 1989; Northern Ireland (Emergency Provisions) Act 1991; Pension Schemes Act 1993; Pension Schemes (Northern Ireland) Act 1993; Health Service Commissioners Act 1993; Intelligence Services Act 1994; Ombudsman (Northern Ireland) Order 1996; Scotland Act 1998; Northern Ireland Act 1998; Regulation of Investigatory Powers Act 2000; Police (Northern Ireland) Act 2000; Justice (Northern Ireland) Act 2002; Police Reform Act 2002; Scottish Public Services Ombudsman Act 2002; Energy Act 2004; Serious Organised Crime and Police Act 2005; Government of Wales Act 2006; Crime and Courts Act 2013; Investigatory Powers Act 2016; National Security Act 2023

Status: Amended

Text of statute as originally enacted

Revised text of statute as amended

Text of the Official Secrets Act 1989 as in force today (including any amendments) within the United Kingdom, from legislation.gov.uk.

The Official Secrets Act 1989 (c. 6) is an act of the Parliament of the United Kingdom that repeals and replaces section 2 of the Official Secrets Act 1911, thereby removing the public interest defence created by that section.

Lord Bingham of Cornhill said that the white paper "Reform of Section 2 of the Official Secrets Act 1911" (Cm. 408) (June 1988) was the immediate precursor of this act and that its recommendations bear directly on the interpretation of this act.

== General information ==
=== Capacity ===
The offences under sections 1(3), 2(1), 3(1) and 4(1) can be committed only by persons who are or have been, and the offence under section 8(1) can be committed only by persons who are, Crown servants or government contractors.

The offences under the act, that can be committed only by persons who, as the case may be, are or have been Crown servants, government contractors, or members of the security and intelligence services, can be committed only where the information, document or other article in question is or has been in the possession of the person in question by virtue of their position as such.

The offences under sections 5(2), 5(6), 6(2), 8(4), 8(5) and 8(6) can be committed by any person.

=== Requirement that the disclosure be "damaging" ===
Sections 1(3), 2(1), 3(1), 5(3)(a) and 6(2) provide that the disclosures to which they apply are not an offence unless they are "damaging". Section 4(2) is similar.

=== Extraterritorial jurisdiction ===
Offences under any provision of the act, other than sections 8(1) or 8(4) or 8(5), committed by any person in the United Kingdom, the Isle of Man, the Channel Islands, or in any colony, or committed by British citizens or Crown servants in any place, are cognisable as offences under the law of the United Kingdom.

=== Arrest and mode of trial ===
In England and Wales, offences under any provision of this Act other than sections 8(1) or 8(4) or 8(5) were formerly classified as arrestable offences, initially by virtue of sections 24(1)(c) and (2)(bb) of the Police and Criminal Evidence Act 1984, and then by virtue of sections 24(1)(c) and (2) of, and paragraph 18 of Schedule 1A to, that act.

The offences under sections 8(1), (4) and (5) are triable only summarily; the others are triable either way.

=== Prescribed bodies and persons ===
Sections 7(5), 8(9), 12 and 13(1) confer powers on the Secretary of State to "prescribe" bodies and persons for certain purposes. These powers have been exercised by the following instruments:

- The Official Secrets Act 1989 (Prescription) Order 1990 (SI 1990/200)
- The Official Secrets Act 1989 (Prescription) (Amendment) Order 1993 (SI 1993/847)
- The Official Secrets Act 1989 (Prescription) (Amendment) Order 2003 (SI 2003/1918)
- The Official Secrets Act 1989 (Prescription) (Amendment) Order 2007 (SI 2007/2148)

=== Proposed revisions ===
The Intelligence and Security Committee (ISC) annual report for 2005–2006 on UK intelligence services states:

Official Secrets Act 113. The Home Office has bid for a legislative slot in the next session to amend the Official Secrets Act 1989. (At the time of publication it was still awaiting confirmation of its place in the timetable.) The Home Office has informed the Committee that, in its view, the proposed Bill should remove the common law defence of duress of circumstance in order to address unauthorised disclosure by members, or former members, of the intelligence and security Agencies. The Bill should also put an element of the associated "authorisation to disclose" procedure onto a statutory footing and increase penalties. This proposal has yet to receive policy clearance across Whitehall.

== Specific provisions ==
=== Section 1 - Security and intelligence ===
Section 1(1) creates an offence of disclosing information, documents or other articles relating to security or intelligence.

It can be committed by any person who is or has been a member of the security and intelligence services, or who is or has been a person notified that he is subject to the provisions of section 1(1).

Cases under this section:

- R v. Shayler [2002] UKHL 11, [2002] All ER 477 (21 March 2002)
- R v. Shayler [2001] EWCA Crim 1977, [2001] WLR 2206 (28 September 2001)

=== Section 2 - Defence ===
Section 2(1) creates an offence of disclosing information, documents or other articles relating to defence. This section applies only to Crown servants and government contractors.

=== Section 3 - International relations ===
Section 3(1)(a) creates an offence of disclosing information, documents or other articles relating to international relations. This includes confidential information, documents or other article from a State other than the United Kingdom or an international organisation. This section applies only to crown servants and government contractors.

=== Section 4 - Crime and special investigation powers ===
This section relates to disclosure of information which would assist a criminal or the commission of a crime. This section applies only to crown servants and government contractors.

=== Section 5 - Information resulting from unauthorised disclosures or entrusted in confidence ===
This section relates to further disclosure of information, documents or other articles protected from disclosure by the preceding sections of the Act. It allows, for example, the prosecution of newspapers or journalists who publish secret information leaked to them by a crown servant in contravention of section 3. This section applies to everyone.

=== Section 6 - Information entrusted in confidence to other States or to international organisations ===
Section 6 creates an offence of making a "damaging disclosure" about security or intelligence, defence or international relations specific to information that was provided in confidence "by or on behalf of the United Kingdom to another State or to an international organisation", where that information comes into the possession of a person, as a result of it being disclosed without that State or organization's authorization and where no other offence under the earlier sections of the Act applies. Lawful authority and prior authorized disclosure are defences against this offence. This section also outlines how confidentiality is defined and how the question of whether the disclosure is 'damaging' will be determined.

=== Section 7 - Authorised disclosures ===
Sections 7(1) to (3) provide that a disclosure is made with lawful authority if, and only if, the conditions specified therein are satisfied.

Section 7(4) provides a defence.

Sections 7(5) and (6) define the expressions "official authorisation" and "official restriction".

=== Section 8 - Safeguarding of information ===
This section makes it a crime for a crown servant or government contractor to retain information beyond their official need for it, and obliges them to properly protect secret information from accidental disclosure.

=== Section 9 - Restriction on prosecutions ===
Section 9(2) provides that no prosecution for an offence, in respect of any such information, document or other article as is mentioned in section 4(2), may be instituted, in England and Wales, except by or with the consent of the Director of Public Prosecutions, or in Northern Ireland, except by or with the consent of the Director of Public Prosecutions for Northern Ireland.

Section 9(1) provides that no prosecution for any other offence under this Act may be instituted, in England and Wales, except by or with the consent of the Attorney General, or in Northern Ireland, except by or with the consent of the Advocate General for Northern Ireland.

The words "Advocate General for Northern Ireland", in section 9(1), were substituted for the words "Attorney General for Northern Ireland" by sections 28 and 87 of, and paragraph 32 of Schedule 7 to, the Justice (Northern Ireland) Act 2002, on 12 April 2010.

=== Section 10 - Penalties ===
This section provides the penalties and mode of trial for offences under the Act.

Section 10(2) provides that a person guilty of an offence under section 8(1) or 8(4) or 8(5) is liable on summary conviction to imprisonment for a term not exceeding three months, or to a fine not exceeding level 5 on the standard scale, or to both.

Section 10(1) provides that a person guilty of any other offence under the Act is liable, on conviction on indictment to imprisonment for a term not exceeding two years, or to a fine, or to both, or, on summary conviction, to imprisonment for a term not exceeding six months, or to a fine not exceeding the statutory maximum, or to both.

The words "51 weeks" are prospectively substituted for the words "three months" in section 10(2) by paragraph 39 of Schedule 26 to the Criminal Justice Act 2003.

=== Section 11 - Arrest, search and trial ===
==== Section 11(1) ====
Section 11(1) inserted section 24(2)(bb) into the Police and Criminal Evidence Act 1984. It also omitted the reference to the Official Secrets Act 1911 in section 24(2)(b) of that Act.

It was repealed on 1 October 2002.

The repeal was consequential on the replacement of section 24(2) of the Police and Criminal Evidence Act 1984 with a new Schedule 1A to that act.

==== Section 11(3) ====
Section 11(3) extends section 9(1) of the Official Secrets Act 1911 (which relates to search warrants).

=== Section 12 - Definition of Crown servant and government contractor ===
Section 12(1) defines the expression "Crown servant" for the purposes of this Act.

Sections 12(2) and (3) define the expression "government contractor" for the purposes of this Act.

=== Section 13 - Other interpretation provisions ===
This section defines the words and expressions "disclose", "disclosure", "international organisation", "prescribed" and "State" for the purposes of the Act.

=== Section 14 ===
This section provides the procedure for making orders under the Act.

=== Section 15 - Acts done abroad and extent ===
Section 15(1)(a) provides that any act done by a British citizen or Crown servant, which would be an offence under any provision of the Act other than sections 8(1) or 8(4) or 8(5) if done by him in the United Kingdom, is an offence under that provision.

This is intended to cover espionage (where someone travels to a foreign country and discloses secret information to a foreign power) and cases where someone travels to a foreign country and discloses secret information, perhaps to a newspaper.

Section 15(1)(b) provides that any act done by any person in any of the Channel Islands, or in the Isle of Man, or in any colony, which would be an offence under any provision of the Act other than sections 8(1) or 8(4) or 8(5) if done by him in the United Kingdom, is an offence under that provision.

Section 15(3) confers a power on The King to extend, by Order in Council, any provision of the Act, subject to any exceptions, adaptations or modifications specified in the Order, to any of the Channel Islands, or to the Isle of Man, or to any colony.

This power was exercised by the Official Secrets Act 1989 (Hong Kong) Order 1992 (S.I. 1992/1301). This part is repealed by the Official Secrets Ordinance in 1997.

=== Section 16 - Citation, commencement, amendments, repeals and revocation ===
Section 16(1) authorises the citation of this Act by a short title.

Section 16(2) authorises the citation of this Act and the Official Secrets Acts 1911 to 1939 by a collective title.

Section 16(5) provides that the repeals of parts of the Official Secrets Act 1911 and the Official Secrets Act 1920 in Schedule 2 do not extend to any of the territories mentioned in section 15(3), subject to any Order made under section 15(3). The said territories mentioned in section 15(3) are the Channel Islands, the Isle of Man and all colonies. Such an Order was made in relation to Hong Kong (see above).

This section also provides for consequential amendments, repeals, a revocation, and commencement.

== See also ==
- Official Secrets Act – equivalent legislation around the world.
- National Security Act 2023 – companion UK legislation.
- Clive Ponting – British civil servant, whose acquittal under the Official Secrets Act 1911 and subsequent book is said to have led to tightening of the law.
- Richard Tomlinson – former MI6 agent imprisoned in 1997 for breaking the 1989 act, by attempting to publish a book detailing his career.
- Katharine Gun – former GCHQ translator arrested under the Act whose case was later dropped by the government.
- O'Connor–Keogh official secrets trial concerning the Al Jazeera bombing memo.
- Halsbury's Statutes

== Bibliography ==
- John Griffin, "The Official Secrets Act 1989" (1989) 16 Journal of Law and Society 273
