= Official Secrets Act 1920 =

Act of the Parliament of the United Kingdom

Official Secrets Act 1920 (Note: Section 11(1).)
- Act of Parliament
- Parliament of the United Kingdom
- Long title: An Act to amend the Official Secrets Act, 1911.
- Citation: 10 & 11 Geo. 5. c. 75
- Territorial extent: United Kingdom (Note: Section 11.)

Dates
- Royal assent: 23 December 1920
- Commencement: 23 December 1920 (Note: The Acts of Parliament (Commencement) Act 1793.)
- Repealed: 20 December 2023 (Note: The National Security Act 2023 (Commencement No. 1 and Saving Provision) Regulations 2023.)
Other legislation
Amends	Official Secrets Act 1911
Amended by	Statute Law Revision Act 1927; Emergency Powers (Defence) Act 1939; Official Secrets Act 1939; Criminal Justice Act 1948; Criminal Procedure (Scotland) Act 1975; Statute Law (Repeals) Act 1976; Forgery and Counterfeiting Act 1981; Interception of Communications Act 1985; Official Secrets Act 1989; Statute Law (Repeals) Act 1993; Postal Services Act 2000
Repealed by	National Security Act 2023

Status: Repealed

Text of statute as originally enacted

Revised text of statute as amended

The Official Secrets Act 1920 (10 & 11 Geo. 5. c. 75) was an act of the Parliament of the United Kingdom.

The act was repealed by and replaced with the National Security Act 2023 (c. 32).

In the Republic of Ireland, the act was repealed by the Official Secrets Act, 1963.

== Section 1 – Unauthorised use of uniforms; falsification of reports, forgery, personation, and false documents ==
Sections 1(1) and (2) of the act provided:

(1) If any person for the purpose of gaining admission, or of assisting any other person to gain admission, to a prohibited place, within the meaning of the Official Secrets Act 1911 (hereinafter referred to as "the principal Act"), or for any other purpose prejudicial to the safety or interests of the State within the meaning of the said Act –

(a) uses or wears, without lawful authority, any naval, military, air-force, police, or other official uniform, or any uniform so nearly resembling the same as to be calculated to deceive, or falsely represents himself to be a person who is or has been entitled to use or wear any such uniform; or
(b) orally, or in writing in any declaration or application, or in any document signed by him or on his behalf, knowingly makes or connives at the making of any false statement or any omission; or
(c) [forges, alters, or] (Note: The words in square brackets in section 1(1)(c) were repealed for England and Wales and Northern Ireland by section 30 of, and Part 1 of the Schedule to, the Forgery and Counterfeiting Act 1981.) tampers with any passport or any naval, military, air-force, police, or official pass, permit, certificate, licence, or other document of a similar character (hereinafter in this section referred to as an official document), [or uses] or has in his possession any [such] forged, altered, or irregular official document; or.
(d) personates, or falsely represents himself to be a person holding, or in the employment of a person holding, office under His Majesty, or to be or not to be a person to whom an official document or secret official code word or pass word has been duly issued or communicated, or with intent to obtain an official document, secret official code word or pass word, whether for himself or any other person, knowingly makes any false statement; or
(e) uses, or has in his possession or under his control, without the authority of the Government Department or the authority concerned, any die, seal, or stamp of or belonging to, or used, made or provided by any Government Department, or by any diplomatic, naval, military, or air-force authority appointed by or acting under the authority of His Majesty, or any die, seal or stamp so nearly resembling any such die, seal or stamp as to be calculated to deceive, or counterfeits any such die, seal or stamp, or uses, or has in his possession, or under his control, any such counterfeited die, seal or stamp;

he shall be guilty of a misdemeanour.

(2) If any person –

(a) retains for any purpose prejudicial to the safety or interests of the State any official document, whether or not completed or issued for use, when he has no right to retain it, or when it is contrary to his duty to retain it, or fails to comply with any directions issued by any Government Department or any person authorised by such department with regard to the return or disposal thereof; or
(b) allows any other person to have possession of any official document issued for his use alone, or communicates any secret official code word or pass word so issued, or, without lawful authority or excuse, has in his possession any official document or secret official code word or pass word issued for the use of some person other than himself, or on obtaining possession of any official document by finding or otherwise, neglects or fails to restore it to the person or authority by whom or for whose use it was issued, or to a police constable; or
(c) without lawful authority or excuse, manufactures or sells, or has in his possession for sale any such die, seal or stamp as aforesaid;

he shall be guilty of a misdemeanour.

"Misdemeanour"

See the Criminal Law Act 1967, the Criminal Law Act (Northern Ireland) 1967 and section 8(2) of this act.

Sentence

A person guilty of an offence under this section is liable on conviction on indictment to imprisonment for a term not exceeding two years, or on summary conviction to imprisonment for a term not exceeding three months, or to a fine not exceeding the prescribed sum, or to both.

== Section 2 – Communications with foreign agents to be evidence of commission of certain offences ==
Section 2 of the act created a rule of evidence in prosecutions under section 1 of the Official Secrets Act 1911.

Section 2(1) of the act provided:

In any proceedings against a person for an offence under section one of the principal Act, the fact that he has been in communication with, or attempted to communicate with, a foreign agent, whether within or without the United Kingdom, shall be evidence that he has, for a purpose prejudicial to the safety or interests of the State, obtained or attempted to obtain information which is calculated to be or might be or is intended to be directly or indirectly useful to an enemy.

See R v Kent [1941] 1 KB 454, 28 Cr App R 23, 57 TLR 307, CCA

"The principal Act"

This means the Official Secrets Act 1911 (see section 1 above).

== Section 3 – Interfering with officers of the police or members of His Majesty’s forces ==
Section 3 of the act provided:

No person in the vicinity of any prohibited place shall obstruct, knowingly mislead or otherwise interfere with or impede, the chief officer or a superintendent or other officer of police, or any member of His Majesty’s forces engaged on guard, sentry, patrol, or other similar duty in relation to the prohibited place, and, if any person acts in contravention of, or fails to comply with, this provision, he shall be guilty of a misdemeanour.

"In the vicinity of"

This expression means "in or in the vicinity of".

"Prohibited place"

This expression is defined by section 3 of the Official Secrets Act 1911.

"Chief officer ... of police"

See section 11(1A) of this act, section 101(1) of the Police Act 1996 and Schedule 1 to the Interpretation Act 1978.

"Superintendent ... of police"

See section 12 of the Official Secrets Act 1911, which is applicable by virtue of section 11(1) of this act.

"Misdemeanour"

See the Criminal Law Act 1967, the Criminal Law Act (Northern Ireland) 1967 and section 8(2) of this act.

Sentence

A person guilty of an offence under this section is liable on conviction on indictment to imprisonment for a term not exceeding two years, or on summary conviction to imprisonment for a term not exceeding three months, or to a fine not exceeding the prescribed sum, or to both.

== Section 6 – Duty of giving information as to commission of offences ==
Section 6 of the act was substituted by section 1 of the Official Secrets Act 1939. After that amendment it provided:

(1) Where a chief officer of police is satisfied that there is reasonable ground for suspecting that an offence under section one of the principal Act has been committed and for believing that any person is able to furnish information as to the offence or suspected offence, he may apply to a Secretary of State for permission to exercise the powers conferred by this subsection and, if such permission is granted, he may authorise a superintendent of police, or any police officer not below the rank of inspector, to require the person believed to be able to furnish information to give any information in his power relating to the offence or suspected offence, and, if so required and on tender of his reasonable expenses, to attend at such reasonable time and place as may be specified by the superintendent or other officer; and if a person required in pursuance of such an authorisation to give information, or to attend as aforesaid, fails to comply with any such requirement or knowingly gives false information, he shall be guilty of a misdemeanour.

(2) Where a chief officer of police has reasonable grounds to believe that the case is one of great emergency and that in the interest of the State immediate action is necessary, he may exercise the powers conferred by the last foregoing subsection without applying for or being granted the permission of a Secretary of State, but if he does so shall forthwith report the circumstances to the Secretary of State.

(3) References in this section to a chief officer of police shall be construed as including references to any officer of police expressly authorised by a chief officer of police to act on his behalf for the purposes of this section when by reason of illness, absence, or other cause he is unable to do so.

References to a chief officer of police, a Secretary of State and the rank of inspector

See section 2(2) of the Official Secrets Act 1939.

"Misdemeanour"

See the Criminal Law Act 1967, the Criminal Law Act (Northern Ireland) 1967 and section 8(2) of this act.

Sentence

A person guilty of an offence under this section is liable on conviction on indictment to imprisonment for a term not exceeding two years, or on summary conviction to imprisonment for a term not exceeding three months, or to a fine not exceeding the prescribed sum, or to both.

== Section 7 – Attempts, incitements, &c. ==
This section provides:

Any person who attempts to commit any offence under the principal Act or this Act, or solicits or incites or endeavours to persuade another person to commit an offence, or aids or abets and does any act preparatory to the commission of an offence under the principal Act or this Act, shall be guilty of a felony or a misdemeanour or a summary offence according as the offence in question is a felony, a misdemeanour or a summary offence, and on conviction shall be liable to the same punishment, and to be proceeded against in the same manner, as if he had committed the offence.

"The principal Act"

This means the Official Secrets Act 1911. (see section 1)

"Aids or abets and does any act preparatory"

The word "and" in this expression must be read as "or". This is necessary in order to make intelligible sense of the section.

See also R v Bingham [1973] QB 870, 57 Cr App R 439, [1973] 2 WLR 520, [1973] 2 All ER 89, [1973] Crim LR 309, CA

Doing an act preparatory to the commission of a crime is not necessarily a crime in any part of the United Kingdom. This offence is an exception.

== Section 8 – Provisions as to trial and punishment of offences ==
Section 8 of the act provided the penalties for the offences under this act and under the Official Secrets Act 1911.

=== Section 8(2) ===
Any person who is guilty of a misdemeanour under the principal Act or this Act shall be liable on conviction on indictment to imprisonment, ... for a term not exceeding two years, or, on conviction under the Summary Jurisdiction Acts, to imprisonment, . . . for a term not exceeding three months or to a fine not exceeding fifty pounds, or both such imprisonment and fine: Provided that no misdemeanour under the principal Act or this Act shall be dealt with summarily except with the consent of the Attorney General.

The words omitted were repealed for England and Wales by section 1(2) of the Criminal Justice Act 1948 (c. 58), for Northern Ireland by section 1(2) of the Criminal Justice Act (Northern Ireland) 1953, and for Scotland by section 221(2) of the Criminal Procedure (Scotland) Act 1975 (c. 21).

"The Summary Jurisdiction Acts"

The effect of section 17(2)(a) of the Interpretation Act 1978 is that the reference to the Summary Jurisdiction Acts must be construed as a reference to the Magistrates' Courts Act 1980

"Fifty pounds"

The reference to a fine not exceeding fifty pounds must be construed as a reference to a fine not exceeding the prescribed sum.

=== Section 8(4) ===
See Attorney General v Leveller Magazine Ltd [1979] AC 440, 68 Cr App R 343, [1979] 2 WLR 247, [1979] 1 All ER 745, [1979] Crim LR 247, HL, reversing [1979] QB 31, [1978] 3 WLR 395, [1978] 3 All ER 731, [1978] Crim LR 627, DC

== See also ==
- Halsbury's Statutes
- Official Secrets Act
