= Official Secrets Act 1911 =

Act of the Parliament of the United Kingdom

Official Secrets Act 1911 (Note: Section 13(1).)
- Act of Parliament
- Parliament of the United Kingdom
- Long title: An Act to re-enact the Official Secrets Act 1889 with Amendments.
- Citation: 1 & 2 Geo. 5. c. 28
- Territorial extent: United Kingdom (Note: Section 10.)

Dates
- Royal assent: 22 August 1911
- Commencement: 22 August 1911 (Note: The Acts of Parliament (Commencement) Act 1793.)
- Repealed: 20 December 2023
Other legislation
Repeals/revokes	Official Secrets Act 1889
Amended by	Official Secrets Act 1920; Official Secrets Act 1939; Statute Law (Repeals) Act 1986; Official Secrets Act 1989; Criminal Justice Act 1948; Criminal Law Act 1967; Justice (Northern Ireland) Act 2002
Repealed by	National Security Act 2023

Status: Repealed

Text of statute as originally enacted

Revised text of statute as amended

The Official Secrets Act 1911 (1 & 2 Geo. 5. c. 28) was an act of the Parliament of the United Kingdom. It replaced the Official Secrets Act 1889 (52 & 53 Vict. c. 52).

The act was introduced in response to public alarm at reports of wide-scale espionage, some of them fomented by popular novels and plays that dramatized the threat, supposedly from Germany, at a time of a rapid naval expansion. Its provisions were extensive, with heavy penalties for any reporting or sketching of military, naval or air defence installations, or the harbouring of people suspected of gathering such intelligence.

It was amended several times; most importantly the "catch-all" provisions contained in section 2 of the act were repealed and replaced by the Official Secrets Act 1989. The act applied in the United Kingdom, the Isle of Man, the Channel Islands, and in overseas crown territories and colonies. It also applied to British subjects anywhere else in the world.

The whole act was repealed and replaced in 2023 by the National Security Act 2023.

In the Republic of Ireland, the whole act was repealed by section 3 of the Official Secrets Act 1963.

== Background ==
The act was passed during a febrile period of "spy fever" in the years leading up to the First World War, with widespread anti-German sentiment in Britain provoked by the Anglo-German naval arms race and events such as the Kruger telegram and the Agadir Crisis. These fuelled numerous press and literary accounts of imaginary German undercover activities, such as William Le Queux's 1909 book, Spies for the Kaiser. Plotting the downfall of England. By the end of 1908, newspapers were receiving hundreds of fanciful letters detailing the activities of suspected German spies. For example, a letter in the Morning Post in May 1907 claimed that there were 90,000 German reservists and spies in Britain, with weapons caches for them in every major city, whilst an article in the 1909 edition of The Annual Register alleged that 50,000 Mauser rifles stored in a cellar near Charing Cross were intended for the 66,000 German reservists rumoured to be in London. Invasion fiction also became extremely popular, with novels such as Erskine Childers' 1903 The Riddle of the Sands, Le Queux's The Invasion of 1910 serialised by the Daily Mail in 1906, and Saki's When William Came of 1913.

The 1911 Agadir Crisis, in which the UK threatened war with Germany, was the final trigger for the government. In an atmosphere of widespread hysteria, it introduced the act in the House of Lords on 25 July 1911. The act was then rushed through Parliament, with little debate or opposition, passing through all of its stages in a single day, 18 August 1911, and receiving royal assent four days later on 22 August. The act, with its extremely wide-ranging powers, replaced the earlier Official Secrets Act 1889 that had provided criminal sanctions only for breaches which could be shown to be contrary to the public interest. Section 1 of the act contained tough provisions against espionage, which were extended by a 1962 Law Lords ruling to cover other activities such as sabotage and physical interference. Section 2 dealt with unauthorised disclosure of information held by servants of the State, making it a criminal offence to disclose any official information without lawful authority. It was only after nearly 80 years that the Official Secrets Act 1989 replaced this provision in the 1911 act.

== Section 1 – Penalties for spying ==
This section is very broadly drafted.

=== Section 1(1) ===
This subsection reads as amended:

1. — (1) If any person for any purpose prejudicial to the safety or interests of the State—

(a) approaches, [inspects, passes over] or is in the neighbourhood of, or enters any prohibited place within the meaning of this Act; or
(b) makes any sketch, plan, model, or note which is calculated to be or might be or is intended to be directly or indirectly useful to an enemy; or
(c) obtains, [collects, records, or publishes,] or communicates to any other person [any secret official code word, or pass word, or any sketch, plan, model, article, or note, or other document or information which is calculated to be or might be or is intended to be directly or indirectly useful to an enemy;

he shall be guilty of felony ...

The words in square brackets were inserted by section 10 of, and the first schedule to, the Official Secrets Act 1920.

The words at the end of this subsection were repealed by section 11(2) of, and the first paragraph of the second schedule to, the Official Secrets Act 1920. They are replaced by section 8(1) of that act.

"For any purpose prejudicial to the safety or interests of the State"

See Chandler v. DPP [1964] AC 763, [1962] 3 All ER 142, HL

"Prohibited place", s. 1(1)(a)

This expression is defined by section 3 of the act.

"Enemy", s. 1(1)(b) and (c)

The expression "enemy" includes a potential enemy.

"Felony"

See Criminal Law Act 1967, the Criminal Law Act (Northern Ireland) 1967, and section 8(1) of the Official Secrets Act 1920

Evidence and presumptions

See section 1(2) of this act and section 2 of the Official Secrets Act 1920.

==== Mode of trial ====
This is an indictable-only offence.

==== Sentence ====
A person guilty of an offence under this section is liable to imprisonment for a term not exceeding fourteen years.

Examples

Hillaire Barnett described sentences for espionage as "swingeing".

George Blake was sentenced to imprisonment for a term of 42 years after pleading guilty to five counts of unlawfully disclosing information contrary to section 1(1)(c). Geoffrey Prime was sentenced to imprisonment for a total of 35 years for disclosing material while employed at GCHQ. Michael Bettany was sentenced to imprisonment for a total of 23 years. Michael Smith was sentenced to imprisonment for 20 years (reduced from 25 on appeal).

History

From 1911 to 1920, an offence under this section was punishable with penal servitude for any term not less than three years and not exceeding seven years.

==== Inchoate offences ====
See section 7 of the Official Secrets Act 1920.

==== Related offences ====
See section 6 of the Official Secrets Act 1920 and section 5(6) of the Official Secrets Act 1989.

=== Section 1(2) ===
This subsection applies to prosecutions under section 1 of the Official Secrets Act 1920 as it applies to prosecutions under section 1 of this act. It now reads:

On a prosecution under this section, it shall not be necessary to show that the accused person was guilty of any particular act tending to show a purpose prejudicial to the safety or interests of the State, and, notwithstanding that no such act is proved against him, he may be convicted if, from the circumstances of the case, or his conduct, or his known character as proved, it appears that his purpose was a purpose prejudicial to the safety or interests of the State; and if any sketch, plan, model, article, note, document, or information relating to or used in any prohibited place within the meaning of this Act, or anything in such a place [or any secret official code word or pass word], is made, obtained, [collected, recorded, published], or communicated by any person other than a person acting under lawful authority, it shall be deemed to have been made, obtained, [collected, recorded, published] or communicated for a purpose prejudicial to the safety or interests of the State unless the contrary is proved.

The words in square brackets were inserted by the Official Secrets Act 1920.

== Section 2 – Wrongful communication, &c. of information ==
This section was repealed for the United Kingdom on 1 March 1990. It has been replaced for the United Kingdom by the Official Secrets Act 1989.

Cases under this section

- See Edgar Lansbury
- The Isis magazine case.
- R v. Aitken, Cairns and another (1971) Unreported, Crown Ct.
- R v. Aubrey, Berry and Campbell (the ABC trial).
- R v. Tisdall (1984) The Times, 26 March 1984 (see Sarah Tisdall).
- R v. Ponting [1985] Crim LR 318, Crown Ct (see Clive Ponting).

Command papers on this section

- Departmental Committee on Section 2 of the Official Secrets Act 1911 (Cmnd. 5104) (1972) – the Franks Committee.
- Reform of Section 2 of the Official Secrets Act 1911 (Cmnd. 7285) (1978)
- Reform of Section 2 of the Official Secrets Act 1911 (Cm. 408) (June 1988)

== Section 3 – Definition of prohibited place ==
For the purposes of this Act, the expression "prohibited place" means—

[(a) any work of defence, arsenal, naval or air force establishment or station, factory, dockyard, mine, minefield, camp, ship, or aircraft belonging to or occupied by or on behalf of His Majesty, or any telegraph, telephone, wireless or signal station, or office so belonging or occupied, and any place belonging to or occupied by or on behalf of His Majesty and used for the purpose of building, repairing, making, or storing any munitions of war, or any sketches, plans, models or documents relating thereto, or for the purpose of getting any metals, oil, or minerals of use in time of war];

(b) any place not belonging to His Majesty where any [munitions of war], or any [sketches, models, plans] or documents relating thereto, are being made, repaired, [gotten,] or stored under contract with, or with any person on behalf of, His Majesty, or otherwise on behalf of His Majesty; and

(c) any place belonging to [or used for the purposes of] His Majesty which is for the time being declared [by order of a Secretary of State] to be a prohibited place for the purposes of this section on the ground that information with respect thereto, or damage thereto, would by useful to an enemy; and

(d) any railway, road, way, or channel, or other means of communication by land or water (including any works or structures being part thereof or connected therewith), or any place used for gas, water, or electricity works or other works for purposes of a public character, or any place where any [munitions of war], or any [sketches, models, plans] or documents relating thereto, are being made, repaired, or stored otherwise than on behalf of His Majesty, which is for the time being declared [by order of a Secretary of State] to be a prohibited place for the purposes of this section, on the ground that information with respect thereto, or the destruction or obstruction thereof, or interference therewith, would be useful to an enemy.

The words in square brackets were inserted or substituted by the Official Secrets Act 1920.

"ship"

References in this Act, whatever their terms, to ships, vessels or boats or activities or places connected therewith are to be construed as including references to hovercraft and activities and places connected with hovercraft.

"any place belonging to or used for the purposes of His Majesty", s.3(c)"

For the purposes of section 3(c), a place belonging to or used for the purposes of the Civil Aviation Authority is deemed to be a place belonging to Her Majesty.

For the purposes of section 3(c), any place belonging to or used for the purposes of the United Kingdom Atomic Energy Authority is deemed to be a place belonging to or used for the purposes of Her Majesty.

For the purposes of section 3(c), every "site to which a permit applies" (within the meaning of paragraph 1 of Schedule 1 to the Nuclear Installations Act 1965) is deemed to be a place belonging to or used for the purposes of Her Majesty.

Places declared to be prohibited places under section 3(c)

Each of the following places, being a site belonging to or used for the purposes of the United Kingdom Atomic Energy Authority, has, on the ground that information with respect thereto, or damage thereto, would be useful to an enemy, been declared to be a prohibited place for the purpose of this section:

- The United Kingdom Atomic Energy Authority site at Harwell, Didcot, Oxfordshire, OX11 0RA.
- The United Kingdom Atomic Energy Authority site at Windscale, Seascale, Cumbria, CA20 1PF.

Each of the following places, being a site to which a permit applies within the meaning of paragraph 1 of Schedule 1 to the Nuclear Installations Act 1965, has, on the ground that information with respect thereto, or damage thereto, would be useful to an enemy, been declared to be a prohibited place for the purpose of this section:

- The British Nuclear Fuels plc site at Sellafield, Seascale, Cumbria, CA20 1PG.
- The British Nuclear Fuels plc site at Capenhurst, near Chester, Cheshire, CH1 6ER.
- The Urenco (Capenhurst) Limited site at Capenhurst, near Chester, Cheshire, CH1 6ER.

Orders made under section 3(c)

- The Official Secrets (Prohibited Place) Order 1955 (SI 1955/1497 (S. 136))
- The Official Secrets (Prohibited Places) Order 1975 (SI 1975/182)
- The Official Secrets (Prohibited Places) (Amendment) Order 1993 (SI 1993/863)
- The Official Secrets (Prohibited Places) Order 1994 (SI 1994/968)

Electronic communications stations and offices

Any electronic communications station or office belonging to, or occupied by, the provider of a public electronic communications service is a prohibited place for the purposes of this act.

=== History ===
From 1984 to 2003, any telecommunications station or office belonging to, or occupied by, a public telecommunications operator was a prohibited place for the purposes of this act.

== Section 7 – Penalty for harbouring spies ==
Section 7 of the act provided:

If any person knowingly harbours any person whom he knows, or has reasonable grounds for supposing, to be a person who is about to commit or who has committed an offence under this Act, or knowingly permits to meet or assemble in any premises in his occupation or under his control any such persons, or if any person having harboured any such person, or permitted to meet or assemble in any premises in his occupation or under his control any such persons, [wilfully omits or refuses] to disclose to a superintendent of police any information which it is in his power to give in relation to any such person he shall be guilty of a misdemeanour . . .

The words in square brackets were substituted for the words "wilfully refuses" by section 10 of, and the First Schedule to, the Official Secrets Act 1920.

The words at the end of this subsection were repealed by section 11(2) of, and the first paragraph of the Second Schedule to, the Official Secrets Act 1920. They are replaced by section 8(1) of that Act.

"Misdemeanour"

See the Criminal Law Act 1967, the Criminal Law Act (Northern Ireland) 1967 and section 8(2) of the Official Secrets Act 1920.

Sentence

A person guilty of an offence under this section is liable on conviction on indictment to imprisonment for a term not exceeding two years, or on summary conviction to imprisonment for a term not exceeding three months, or to a fine not exceeding the prescribed sum, or to both.

History

From 1911 to 1920, a person guilty of an offence under this section was liable to imprisonment with or without hard labour for a term not exceeding one year, or to a fine, or to both imprisonment and a fine.

== Section 8 – Restriction on prosecution ==
Section 8 of the act provided that a prosecution for an offence under this act may only be instituted by, or with the consent of, the Attorney General.

== Section 9 – Search warrants ==
Section 9 of the act provided:

(1) If a justice of the peace is satisfied by information on oath that there is reasonable ground for suspecting that an offence under this Act has been or is about to be committed, he may grant a search warrant authorising any constable [named therein] to enter at any time any premises or place named in the warrant, if necessary, by force, and to search the premises or place and every person found therein, and to seize any sketch, plan, model, article, note, or document, or anything of a like nature or anything which is evidence of an offence under this Act having been or being about to be committed, which he may find on the premises or place or on any such person, and with regard to or in connexion with which he has reasonable ground for suspecting that an offence under this Act has been or is about to be committed. (2) Where it appears to a superintendent of police that the case is one of great emergency and that in the interest of the State immediate action is necessary, he may by a written order under his hand give to any constable the like authority as may be given by the warrant of a justice under this section.

The words "named therein" in square brackets in section 9(1) were repealed for England and Wales by section 119(2) of, and Part I of Schedule 7 to, the Police and Criminal Evidence Act 1984.

Section 9(1) was extended by section 11(3) of the Official Secrets Act 1989.

"Oath", s.9(1)

This expression includes affirmation and declaration.

== Section 11 – Saving for laws of British possessions ==
This section now provides:

If by any law made before or after the passing of this Act by the legislature of any British possession provisions are made which appear to His Majesty to be of the like effect as those contained in this Act, His Majesty may, by Order in Council, suspend the operation within that British possession of this Act, or of any part thereof, so long as that law continues in force there, and no longer, . . . : Provided that the suspension of this Act, or of any part thereof, in any British possession shall not extend to the holder of an office under His Majesty who is not appointed to that office by the Government of that possession.

The words omitted were repealed by section 1(1) of, and part XII of schedule 1 to, the Statute Law (Repeals) Act 1986, which came into force on 2 May 1986.

The power conferred by this section has been exercised by the following Orders:

Official Secrets (Commonwealth of Australia) Order in Council 1915 (Note: Section 1.)
- Statutory Rules and Orders
- Parliament of the United Kingdom
- Citation: SR&O 1915/1199
- Territorial extent: United Kingdom

Dates
- Made: 30 November 1915
Other legislation
Amends	Commonwealth of Australia of the Official Secrets Act 1911
Made under	Official Secrets Act 1911

Text of statute as originally enacted

Official Secrets (Jersey) Order in Council 1952 (Note: Section 2.)
- Statutory Instrument
- Parliament of the United Kingdom
- Citation: SI 1952/1034
- Territorial extent: United Kingdom

Dates
- Made: 23 May 1952
Other legislation
Amends	Island of Jersey of the Official Secrets Act 1911; Island of Jersey of the Official Secrets Act 1939
Made under	Official Secrets Act 1911

Text of statute as originally enacted

- Official Secrets (Commonwealth of Australia) Order in Council 1915 (SR&O 1915/1199) (following passage of the Crimes Act 1914)
- Official Secrets (Jersey) Order in Council 1952 (SI 1952/1034) (following passage of the Official Secrets (Jersey) Law 1952)

== Section 13 – Short title and repeal ==
Section 13(2) repealed the Official Secrets Act 1889. It was repealed by the Statute Law Revision Act 1927 because it was spent by virtue of the Interpretation Act 1889 (effect of repeal).

== European Communities Act 1972 ==
Section 11(2) of the European Communities Act 1972 must be construed and the Official Secrets Acts 1911 to 1939 have effect, as if that section were contained in this act but so that sections 10 and 11, except section 10(4), do not apply.

== Subsequent developments ==
Section 10(2) of the act, from the words " and the Criminal Jurisdiction Act 1802 " onwards, was repealed for England and Wales by section 10(2) of, and part I of schedule 3 to, the Criminal Law Act 1967, which came into force on 1 January 1968.

In section 10(3) of the act, the words " by any court of general or quarter sessions nor ", were repealed for England and Wales by section 10(2) of, and part II of schedule 3 to, the Criminal Law Act 1967, which came into force on 1 January 1968.

== See also ==
- Official Secrets Act
- Zircon affair
- Defense Secrets Act of 1911 (United States)
