= Edith Cavell =

British nurse (1865–1915)

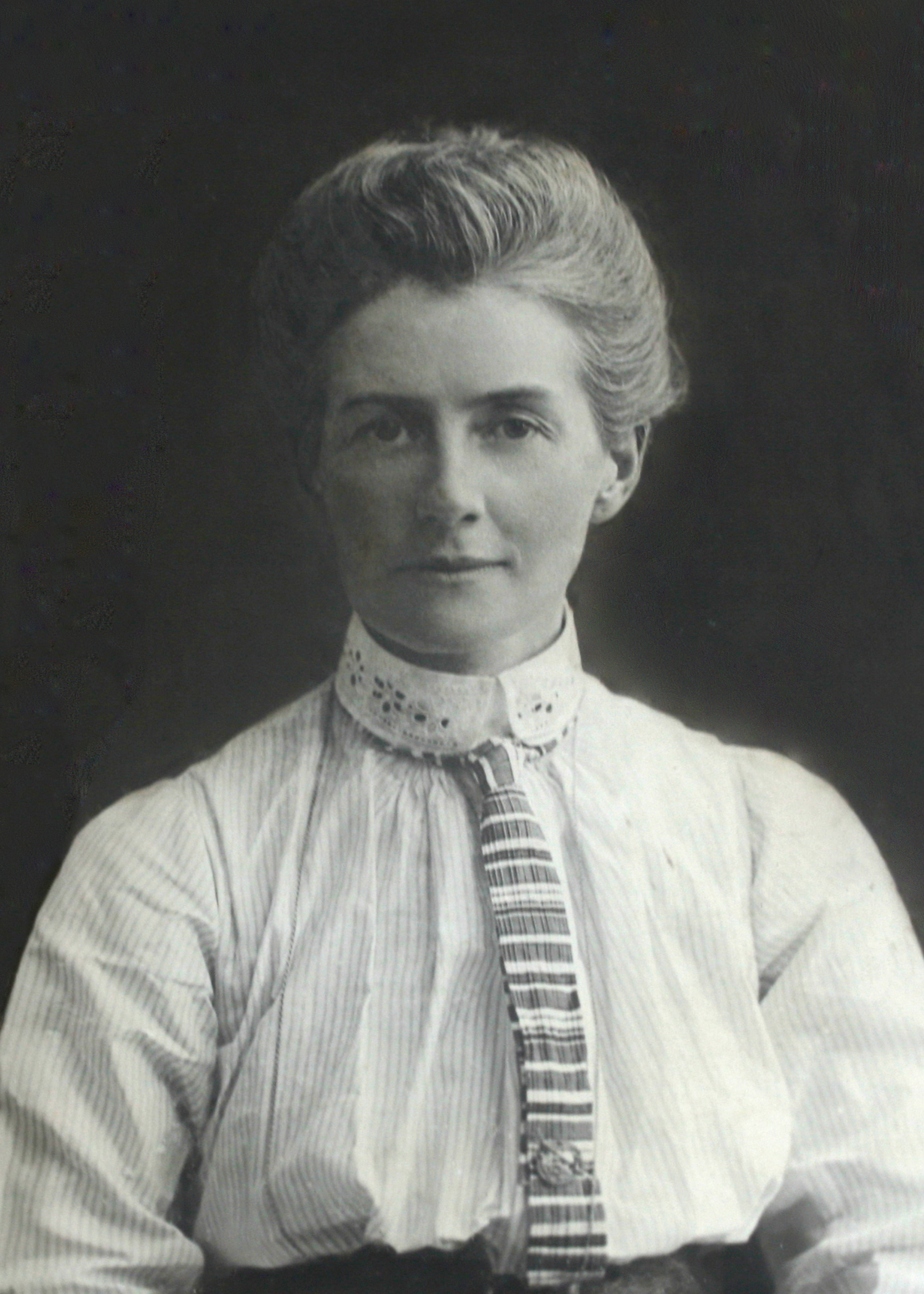

Nurse
- Born: Edith Louisa Cavell; 4 December 1865; Swardeston, Norfolk, England
- Died: 12 October 1915 (aged 49); Tir national, Schaerbeek, Brussels, German-occupied Belgium
- Cause of death: Execution by firing squad
- Venerated in: Church of England
- Feast: 12 October (Anglican memorial day)

Edith Louisa Cavell (/ˈkævəl/ KAV-əl; 4 December 1865 – 12 October 1915) was a British nurse. During the First World War, she treated wounded soldiers from both sides without discrimination, and helped some 200 Allied soldiers escape from German-occupied Belgium. She was arrested, court-martialled under German military law, and sentenced to death by firing squad. Despite international pressure for mercy, the German government refused to commute her sentence and she was shot. The execution received worldwide condemnation and extensive press coverage.

The night before her execution, she said, "Patriotism is not enough. I must have no hatred or bitterness towards anyone." These words were inscribed on the Edith Cavell Memorial opposite the entrance to the National Portrait Gallery near Trafalgar Square, London. Her strong Anglican beliefs propelled her to help all those who needed it including both German and Allied soldiers. She was quoted as saying, "I can't stop while there are lives to be saved." The Church of England commemorates her in its Calendar of Saints on 12 October.

Cavell was a pioneer of modern nursing in Belgium.

== Early life and career ==
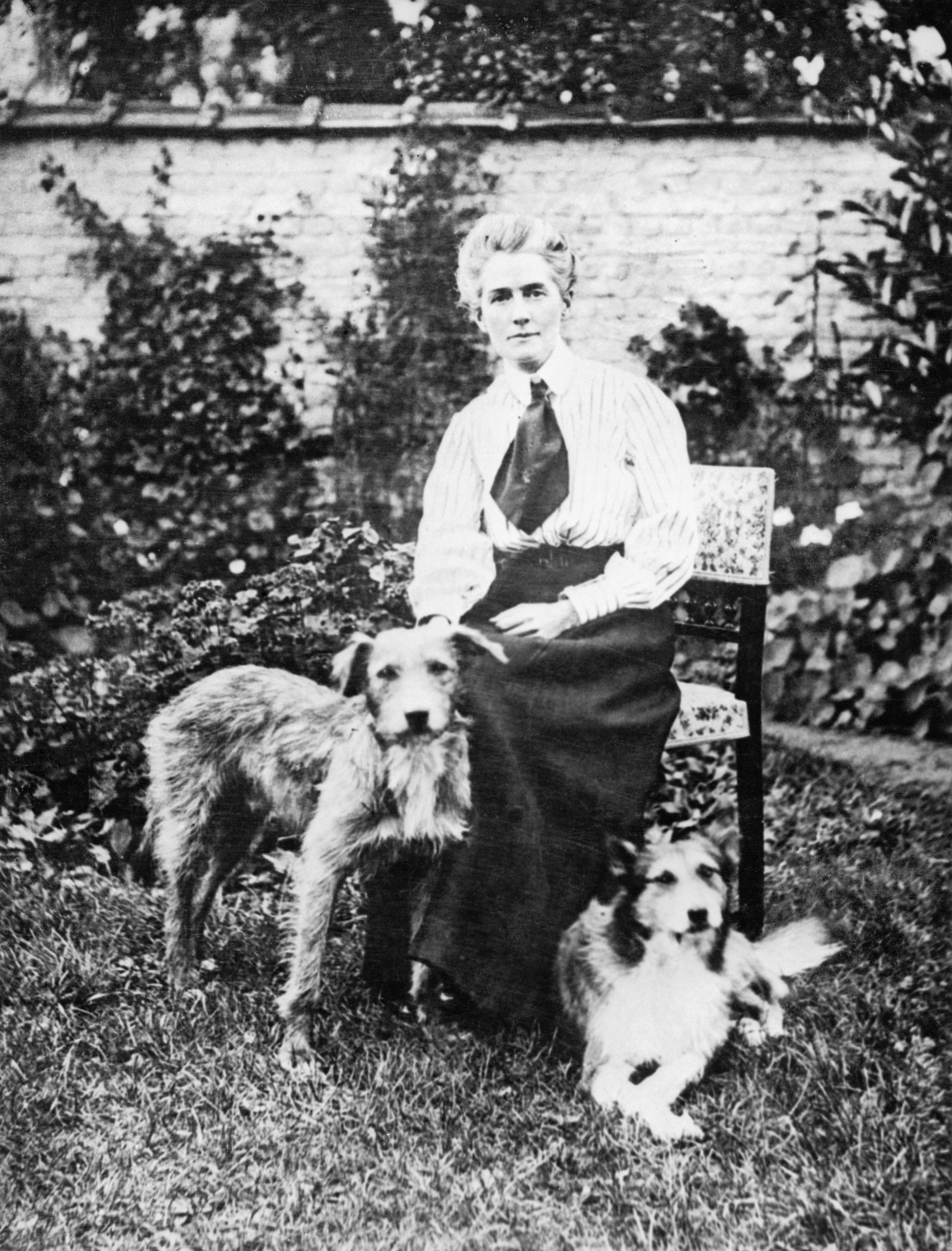
Cavell in a garden in Brussels with her two dogs before the outbreak of war

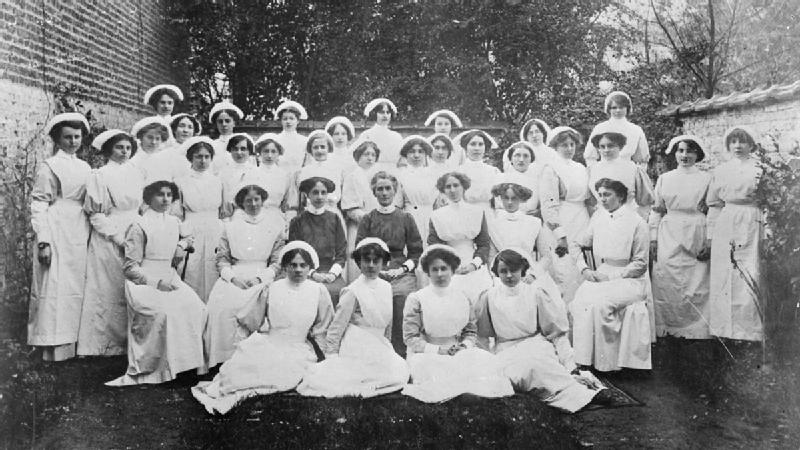
Cavell (seated centre) with a group of multinational student nurses whom she trained in Brussels

Edith Louisa Cavell was born on 4 December 1865 in Swardeston, a village near Norwich, where her father, the Reverend Frederick Cavell. served as vicar for 45 years. She was the eldest of four children of Frederick (1824–1910) and his wife, Louisa Sophia Warming (1835–1918). Her siblings were Florence Mary (1867–1950), Mary Lilian (1870–1967), and John Frederick Scott (1872–1923).

Cavell was educated at Norwich High School for Girls, then at boarding schools in Clevedon, Somerset, and Peterborough (Laurel Court).

After working as a governess, including for a family in Brussels from 1890 to 1895, Cavell returned home to care for her father during a serious illness. The experience led her to become a nurse after her father's recovery. Cavell worked as a nurse at the Fountain Fever Hospital in Tooting from December 1895. Aged 30, Cavell applied to become a nurse probationer at the London Hospital and began working as a regular probationer there in September 1896 under Matron Eva Luckes. Cavell was seconded to work with other London Hospital nurses during the Maidstone typhoid epidemic from 15 October 1897 until early January 1898, while still a probationer. Along with other staff, she was awarded the Maidstone Typhoid Medal. After her training, Cavell worked from October 1898 to December 1899 as a private nurse employed by the Private Nursing Institution of the London Hospital, treating patients in their homes. Cavell travelled to tend to patients with cancer, gout, pneumonia, pleurisy, eye conditions and appendicitis. In 1901, Luckes recommended Cavell for the position of night superintendent at St Pancras Infirmary. In November 1903, she became assistant matron of St Leonard's Infirmary in Shoreditch. In 1906, Cavell took a temporary post as matron of the Manchester and Salford Sick and Poor and Private Nursing Institution, working there for about nine months.

== Work in Belgium ==
In 1907, Cavell was recruited by Dr. Antoine Depage, the Belgian royal surgeon, and the founder and president of the Belgian Red Cross, to be matron of a newly established nursing school, L'École Belge d'Infirmières Diplômées (or the Berkendael Medical Institute) on the Rue de la Culture (now Rue Franz Merjay), in Ixelles, Brussels. By 1910, "Miss Cavell 'felt that the profession of nursing had gained sufficient foothold in Belgium to warrant the publishing of a professional journal' and launched the nursing journal, L'infirmière". Within a year, she was training nurses for three hospitals, twenty-four schools, and thirteen kindergartens in Belgium.

Cavell was offered a position as matron in a Brussels clinic. She worked closely with Depage, who was part of a "growing body of people" in the medical profession in Belgium. He realised that the care that was being provided by the religious institutions had not been keeping up with medical advances. In 1910, Cavell was asked if she would be the matron for the new secular hospital at Saint-Gilles.

When the First World War broke out, Cavell was visiting her widowed mother in Norfolk. She returned to Brussels, where her clinic and nursing school were taken over by the Red Cross.

== Assistance to Allied soldiers ==
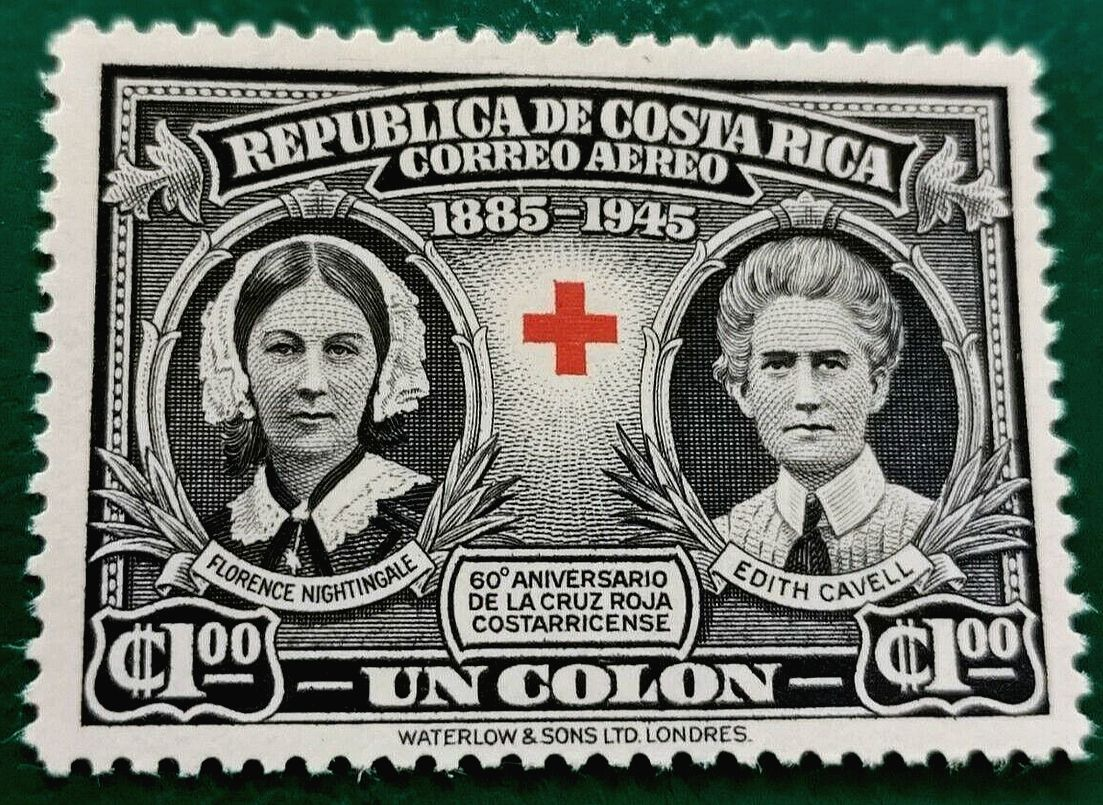
Florence Nightingale and Cavell on a postage stamp marking 60 years of the Costa Rican Red Cross

In November 1914, after the German occupation of Brussels, Cavell began sheltering British soldiers and funnelling them out of occupied Belgium to the neutral Netherlands. Wounded British and French soldiers as well as Belgian and French civilians of military age were hidden from the Germans and provided with false papers by Prince Réginald de Croÿ at his château of Bellignies near Mons. From there, they were conducted by various guides to the houses of Cavell, Louis Séverin, and others in Brussels, where their hosts would furnish them with money to reach the Dutch frontier, and provide them with guides obtained through Philippe Baucq. This placed Cavell in violation of German military law. German authorities became increasingly suspicious of the nurse's actions, which were further fuelled by her outspokenness.

=== Arrest and trial ===
Cavell was arrested on 6 August 1915 and charged with harbouring Allied soldiers. She had been betrayed by Georges Gaston Quien, who was later convicted by a French court as a collaborator. Cavell was held in Saint-Gilles prison for ten weeks, the last two of which were spent in solitary confinement. She made three depositions to the German police (on 8, 18, and 22 August), admitting that she had been instrumental in conveying about 60 British and 15 French soldiers, as well as about 100 French and Belgian civilians of military age, to the frontier and had sheltered most of them in her house.

At her court-martial, Cavell was prosecuted for aiding British and French soldiers, and young Belgian men, to cross the Dutch border and eventually enter Britain. She admitted her guilt when she signed a statement the day before the trial. Cavell declared that the soldiers she had helped escape thanked her in writing when they arrived safely in Britain. This admission confirmed that Cavell had not only helped the soldiers navigate the Dutch frontier, but it also established that she helped them escape to a country at war with Germany. Her fellow defendants included Prince Reginald's sister, Princess Marie of Croÿ.

The penalty, according to German military law, was death. Paragraph 58 of the German Military Code determined that "In time of war, anyone who, with the intention of aiding a hostile power, or of causing harm to German or allied troops," commits any of the crimes defined in paragraph 90 of the German Penal Code "shall be punished with death for war treason." Specifically, Cavell was charged under paragraph 90 (1) no. 3 Reichsstrafgesetzbuch, for "conveying troops to the enemy," a crime normally punishable by life imprisonment in peacetime. It was possible to charge Cavell with perfidy, or war treason (German: Kriegsverrat), as paragraph 160 of the German Military Code extended application of paragraph 58 to foreigners "present in the zone of war."

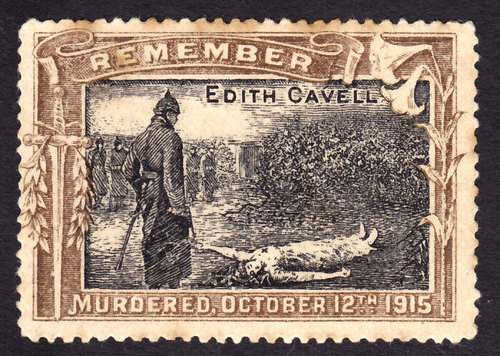
A propaganda stamp issued shortly after Cavell's death

While the First Geneva Convention ordinarily guaranteed protection of medical personnel, such protection was forfeit if medical practices were seen to be used as cover for belligerent action. This forfeiture is expressed in article 7 of the 1906 version of the convention, which was the version in force at the time and justified prosecution under German military law.

The British government could therefore do nothing to help her. Sir Horace Rowland of the Foreign Office said, "I am afraid that it is likely to go hard with Miss Cavell; I am afraid we are powerless." Lord Robert Cecil, Under-Secretary for Foreign Affairs, advised that, "Any representation by us will do her more harm than good." The United States, however, had not yet joined the war and was in a position to apply diplomatic pressure. Hugh S. Gibson, Secretary to the U.S. Legation at Brussels, made clear to the German government that executing Cavell would further harm Germany's already damaged reputation. Later, he wrote:

We reminded [German civil governor Baron von der Lancken] of the burning of Louvain and the sinking of the Lusitania, and told him that this murder would rank with those two affairs and would stir all civilized countries with horror and disgust. Count Harrach broke in at this with the rather irrelevant remark that he would rather see Miss Cavell shot than have harm come to the humblest German soldier, and his only regret was that they had not "three or four old English women to shoot."

Baron von der Lancken is known to have stated that Cavell should be pardoned because of her complete honesty and because she had helped save so many lives, German as well as Allied. However, General von Sauberzweig, the military governor of Brussels, ordered that "in the interests of the State" the implementation of the death penalty against Baucq and Cavell should be immediate, denying higher authorities an opportunity to consider clemency. Cavell was represented by defence lawyer Sadi Kirschen from Brussels. Of the twenty-seven defendants, five were condemned to death: Cavell, Baucq (an architect in his thirties), Louise Thuliez, Séverin and Countess Jeanne de Belleville. Of the five sentenced to death, only Cavell and Baucq were executed; the other three were granted reprieves.

Cavell was arrested not for espionage, as many were led to believe, but for "war treason" despite not being a German national. She may have been recruited by the British Secret Intelligence Service (SIS), and turned away from her espionage duties in order to help Allied soldiers escape, although this is not widely accepted. Rankin cites the published statement of M. R. D. Foot, historian and Second World War British intelligence officer, as to Cavell having been part of SIS or MI6. The former director-general of MI5, Stella Rimington, announced in 2015 that she had unearthed documents in Belgian military archives that confirmed an intelligence-gathering aspect to Cavell's network. The BBC Radio 4 programme that presented Rimington's quote, noted Cavell's use of secret codes and, though amateurish, other network members' successful transmission of intelligence.

When in custody, Cavell was questioned in French, but her trial was minuted in German; which some assert gave the prosecutor the opportunity to misinterpret her answers. Although she may have been misrepresented, she made no attempt to defend herself, but responded to have channelled "environ deux cents" ("about two hundred") soldiers to the Dutch border. Cavell was provided with a defender approved by the German military governor; a previous defender, who was chosen for Cavell by her assistant, Elizabeth Wilkins, was ultimately rejected by the governor.

=== Execution ===
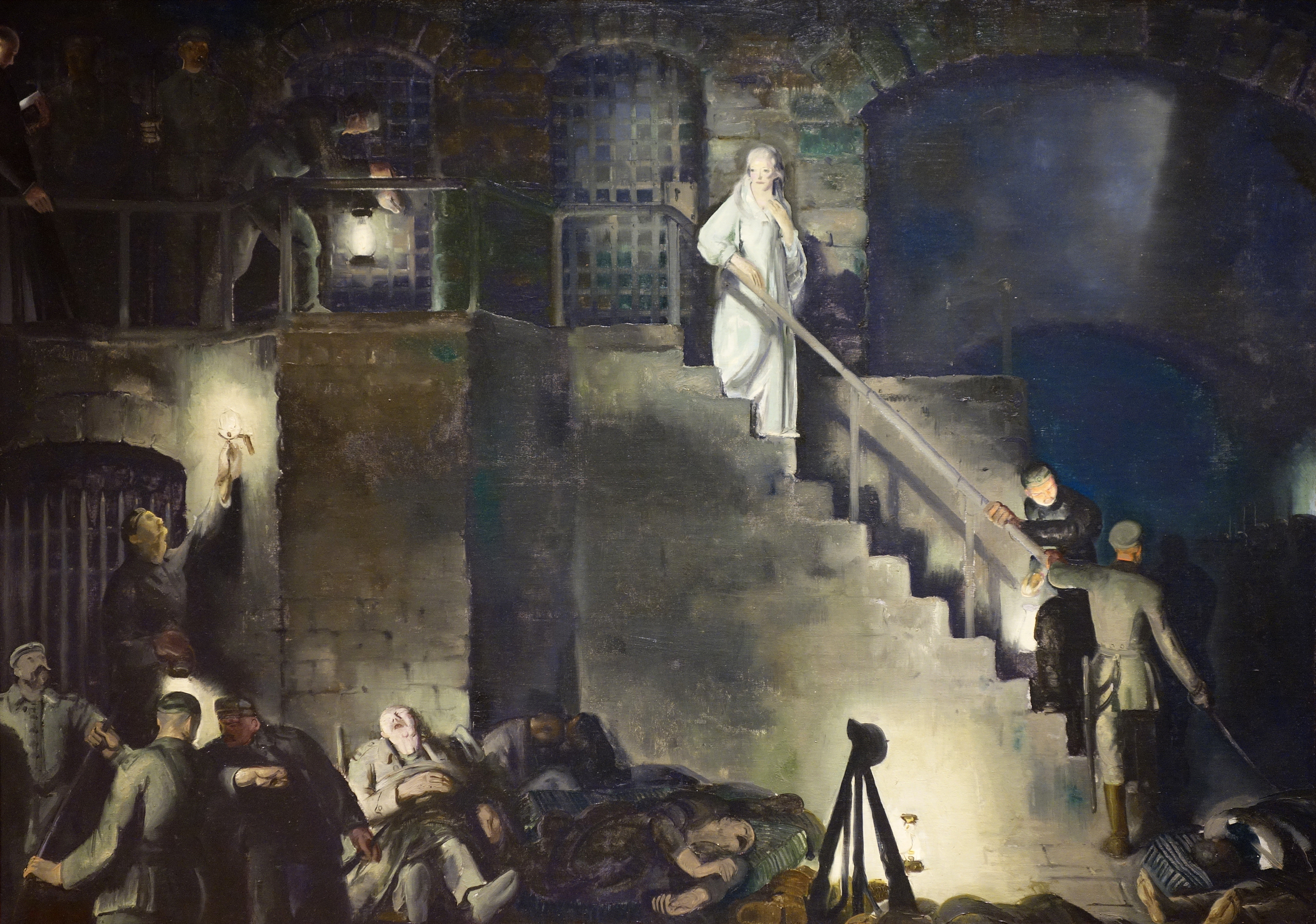
The Murder of Edith Cavell, (George Bellows, 1918)

The night before her execution, Cavell told the Reverend H. Stirling Gahan, the Anglican chaplain of Christ Church Brussels, who had been allowed to see her and to give her Holy Communion, "I am thankful to have had these ten weeks of quiet to get ready. Now I have had them and have been kindly treated here. I expected my sentence and I believe it was just. Standing as I do in view of God and Eternity, I realise that patriotism is not enough, I must have no hatred or bitterness towards anyone." These words are inscribed on her statues in London and in Melbourne, Australia. Cavell's final words to the German Lutheran prison chaplain, Paul Le Seur, were recorded as, "Ask Father Gahan to tell my loved ones later on that my soul, as I believe, is safe, and that I am glad to die for my country."

From his sick bed, Brand Whitlock, the U.S. ambassador to Belgium, wrote a personal note on Cavell's behalf to Moritz von Bissing, the Governor-General of Belgium. Hugh Gibson; Maitre G. de Leval, the legal adviser to the United States legation; and Rodrigo de Saavedra y Vinent, 2nd Marques de Villalobar, the Spanish minister, formed a midnight deputation of appeal for mercy or at least postponement of execution. Despite these efforts, on 11 October, Baron von der Lancken allowed the execution to proceed. Sixteen men, forming two firing squads, carried out the sentence pronounced on her and on four Belgian men at the Tir national shooting range in Schaerbeek, at 7:00 am on 12 October 1915. There are conflicting reports of the details of Cavell's execution. However, according to the eyewitness account of the Reverend Le Seur, who attended Cavell in her final hours, eight soldiers fired at Cavell while the other eight executed Baucq. Her execution, certification of death, and burial were witnessed by the German war poet Gottfried Benn in his capacity as a 'Senior Doctor in the Brussels Government since the first days of the (German) occupation'. Benn wrote a detailed account titled "Wie Miss Cavell erschossen wurde" (How Miss Cavell was shot, 1928).

There is also a dispute over the sentencing imposed under the German Military Code. Supposedly, the death penalty relevant to the offence committed by Cavell was not officially declared until a few hours after her death. The British post-war Committee of Enquiry into Breaches of the Laws of War however regarded the verdict as legally correct.

On instructions from the Spanish minister, Belgian women immediately buried Cavell's body next to Saint-Gilles Prison. After the war, her body was taken back to Britain for a memorial service at Westminster Abbey and then transferred to Norwich, to be laid to rest at Life's Green on the east side of the cathedral. The King had to grant an exception to an Order in Council of 1854, which prevented any burials in the grounds of the cathedral, to allow the reburial.

== International reaction ==
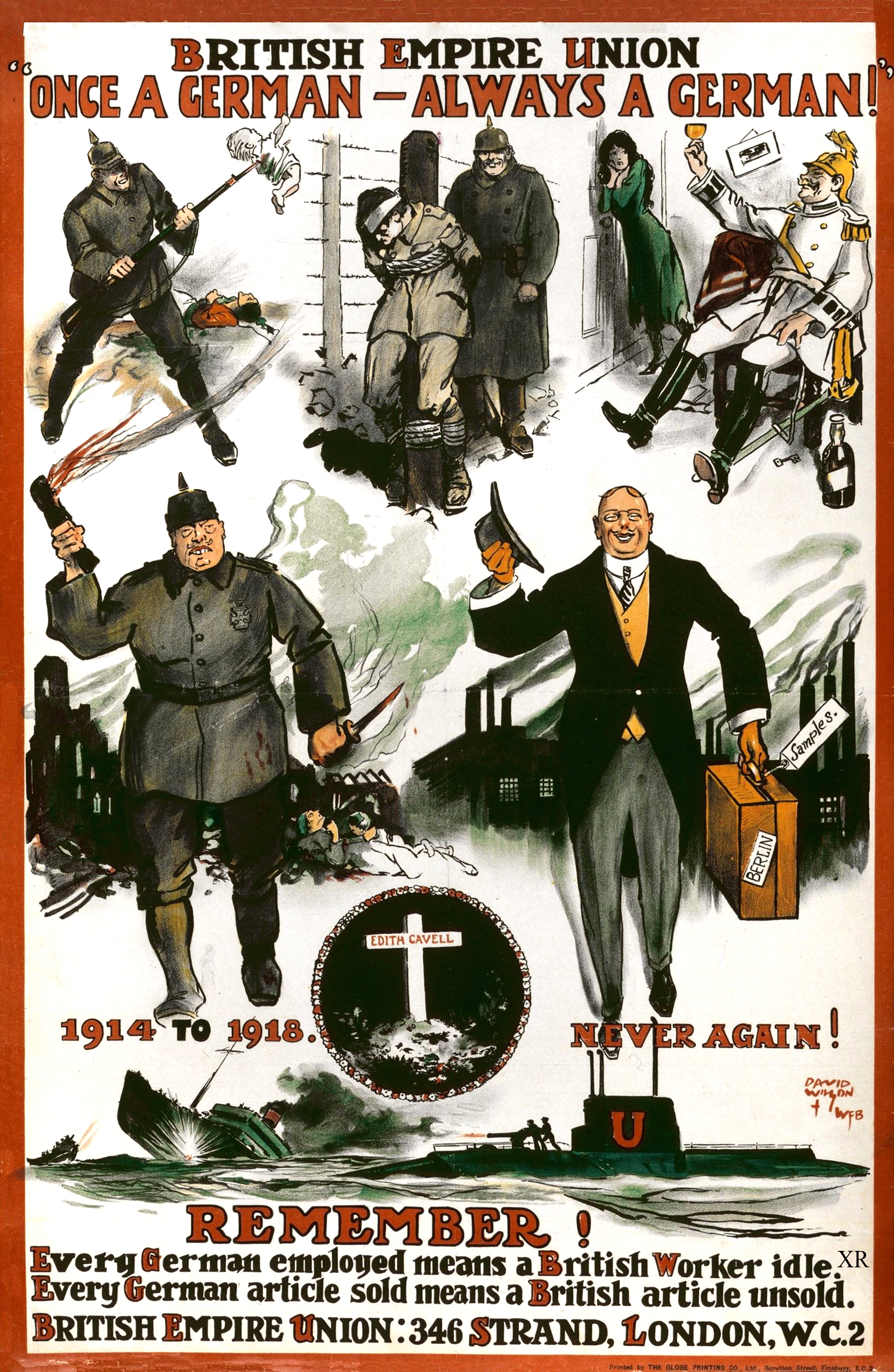
An anti-German post-First World War poster from the British Empire Union, including Cavell's grave

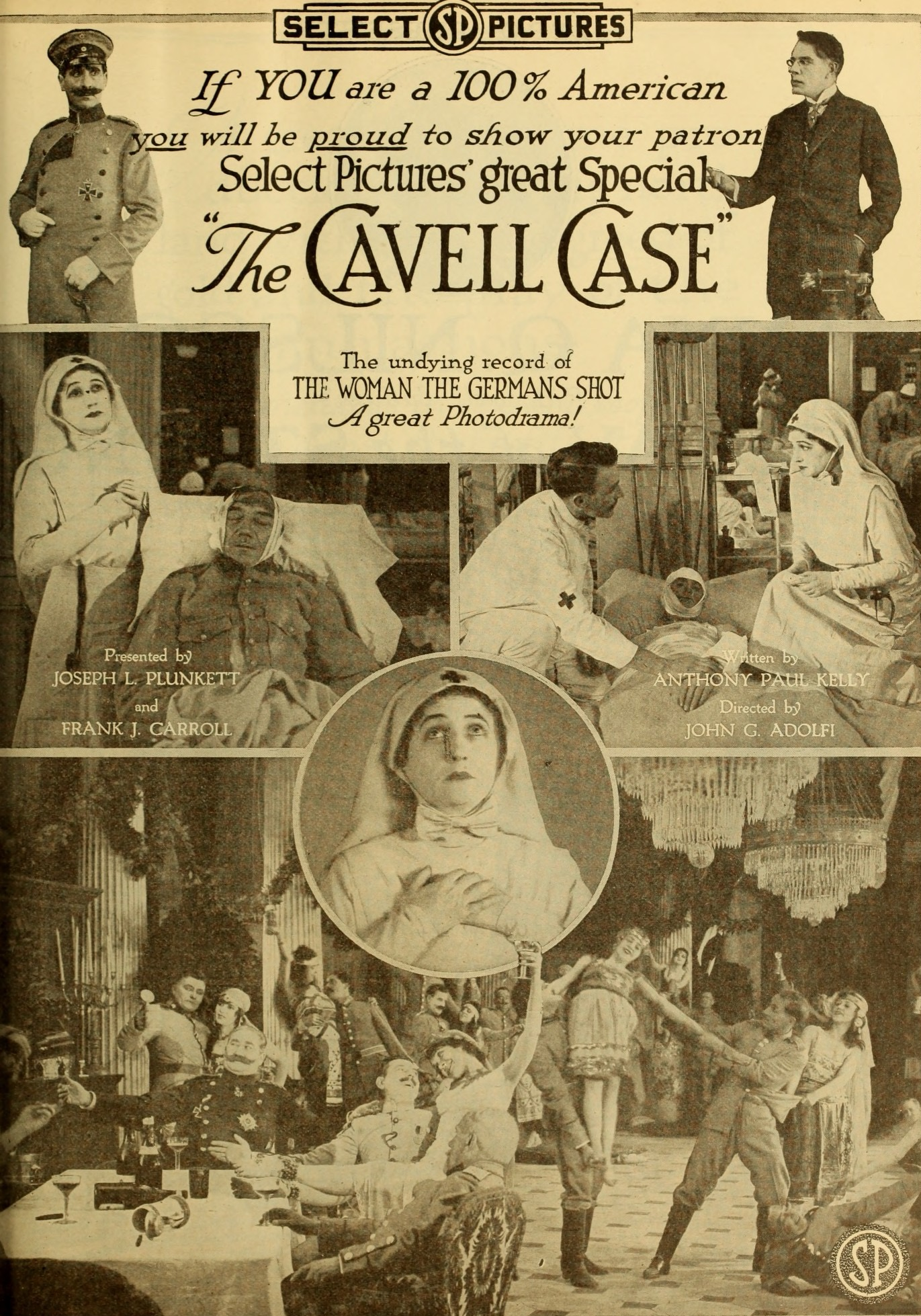
The Cavell Case (1919), an American film

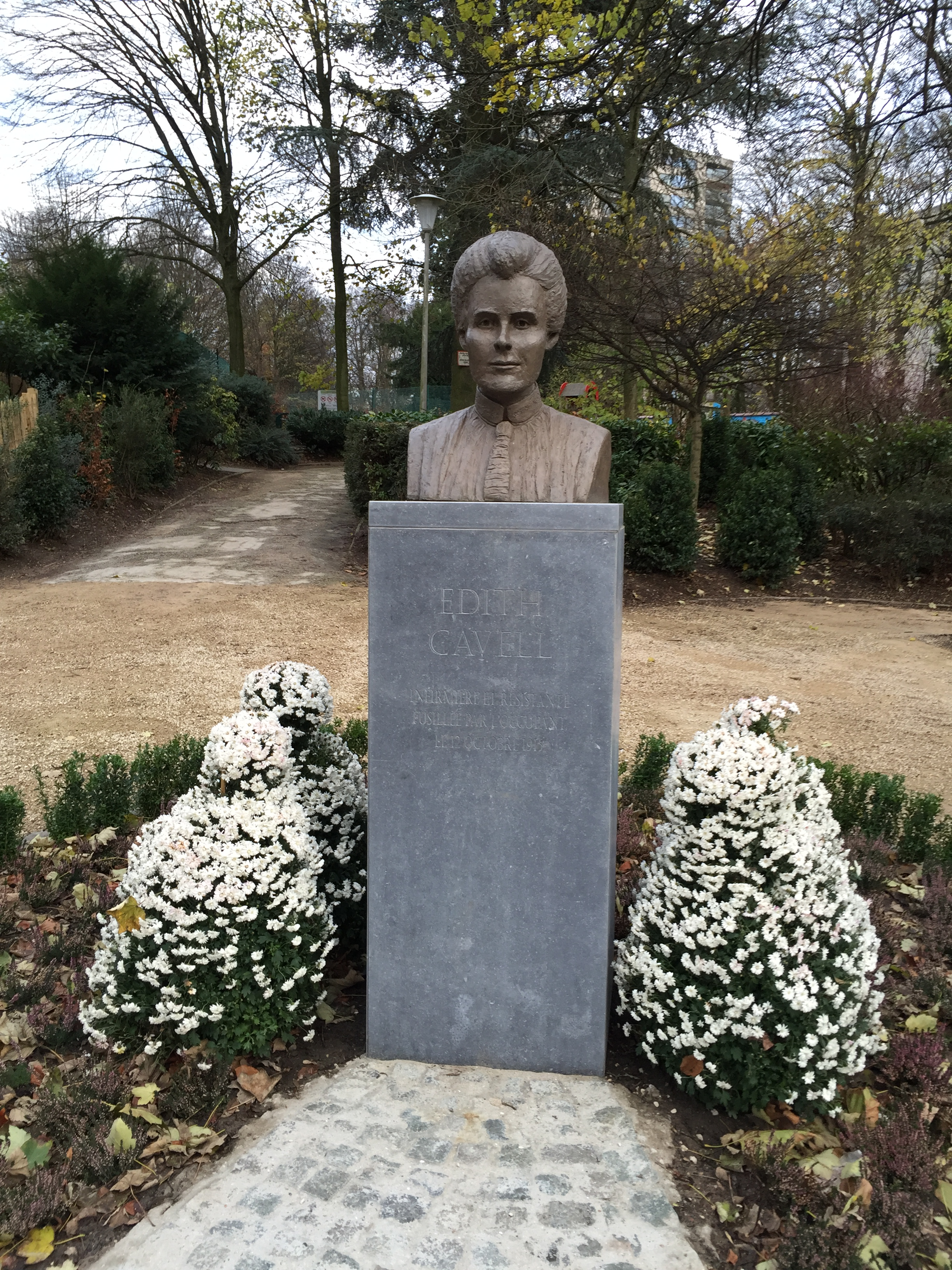
Edith Cavell sculpture (Uccle 2015) by Nathalie Lambert, marking the centenary of her death

Following Cavell's death, countless newspaper articles, pamphlets, images, and books publicised her story. She became an iconic propaganda figure for military recruitment in Britain, and to help increase favourable sentiment towards the Allies in the United States. Along with the invasion of Belgium, and the sinking of the Lusitania, Cavell's execution was widely publicised in both Britain and North America by Wellington House, the British War Propaganda Bureau. She was a popular icon because of her sex, her nursing profession, and her apparently heroic approach to death. Her execution was represented as an act of German barbarism and moral depravity - very much at variance with Cavell's own clearly stated wish to have "no hatred or bitterness towards anyone."

News reports shortly after Cavell's execution were inaccurate. The American Journal of Nursing repeated the fictional account of Cavell's execution in which she fainted and fell because of her refusal to wear a blindfold in front of the firing squad. Allegedly, while she lay unconscious, the German commanding officer shot her dead with a revolver.

Because of the British government's decision to publicise Cavell's story as part of its propaganda effort, she became the most prominent British female casualty of the First World War. The combination of heroic appeal and a resonant atrocity-story narrative made Cavell's case one of the most effective in British propaganda of the war.

Before the First World War, Cavell was not well known outside nursing circles. This allowed two different depictions of the truth about her in British propaganda, which were a reply to enemy attempts to justify her shooting, including the suggestion that Cavell, during her interrogation, had given information that incriminated others. In November 1915, the British Foreign Office issued a denial that Cavell had implicated anyone else in her testimony.

One image commonly represented was of Cavell as an innocent victim of a ruthless and dishonourable enemy. This view depicted her as having helped Allied soldiers to escape, but innocent of 'espionage', and was most commonly used in various forms of British propaganda, such as postcards and newspaper illustrations during the war. Her story was presented in the British press as a means of fuelling a desire for revenge on the battlefield. These images implied that men must enlist in the armed forces immediately in order to stop forces that could arrange the judicial murder of an innocent British woman.

Another representation of a side of Cavell during the First World War saw her described as a serious, reserved, brave, and patriotic woman who devoted her life to nursing and died to save others. This portrayal has been illustrated in numerous biographical sources, from personal first-hand experiences of the Red Cross nurse. Pastor Le Seur, the German army chaplain, recalled at the time of her execution, "I do not believe that Miss Cavell wanted to be a martyr ... but she was ready to die for her country ...a very brave woman and a faithful Christian". Another account from Anglican chaplain, the Reverend Gahan, remembers Cavell's words, "I have no fear or shrinking; I have seen death so often it is not strange, or fearful to me!" In this interpretation, her stoicism was seen as remarkable for a non-combatant woman, and brought her even greater renown than a man in similar circumstances would have received.

=== German justification ===
The Imperial German government thought that it had acted fairly towards Cavell. In a letter, German Undersecretary for Foreign Affairs, Alfred Zimmermann (not to be confused with Arthur Zimmermann, German Secretary for Foreign Affairs) made a statement to the press on behalf of the German government:

It was a pity that Miss Cavell had to be executed, but it was necessary. She was judged justly ... It is undoubtedly a terrible thing that the woman has been executed; but consider what would happen to a State, particularly in war, if it left crimes aimed at the safety of its armies to go unpunished because they were committed by women.

From the perspective of the German government, had it released Cavell there might have been a surge in the number of women participating in acts against Germany because they knew they would not be severely punished. It took the view that it was up to the responsible men to follow their legal duty to Germany and ignore the world's condemnation. Its laws did not make distinctions between sexes; the only exception to this being that, according to legal customs, women in a "delicate" (probably this means "pregnant") condition should not be executed. However, in January 1916, the Kaiser decreed that, from then on, capital punishment should not be carried out on women without his explicit prior endorsement.

The German government also believed that all of the convicted people were thoroughly aware of the nature of their acts. The court paid particular attention to this point, releasing several people because there was doubt as to whether the accused knew that their actions were punishable. The condemned, in contrast, knew full well what they were doing and the punishment for committing their crimes because "numerous public proclamations had pointed out the fact that aiding enemies’ armies was punishable with death."

== Repatriation and burial ==
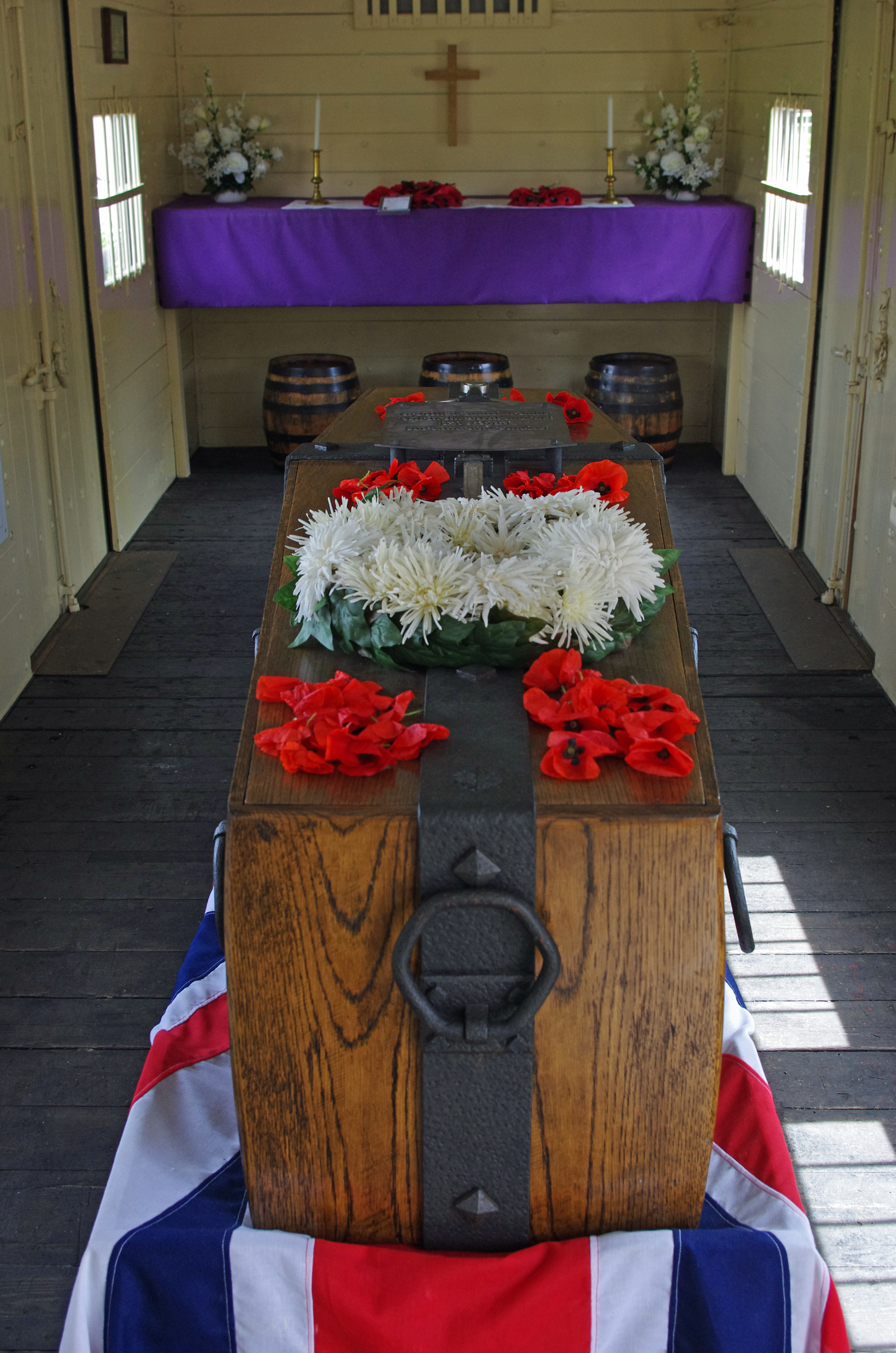
Interior of the Cavell Van at Bodiam railway station

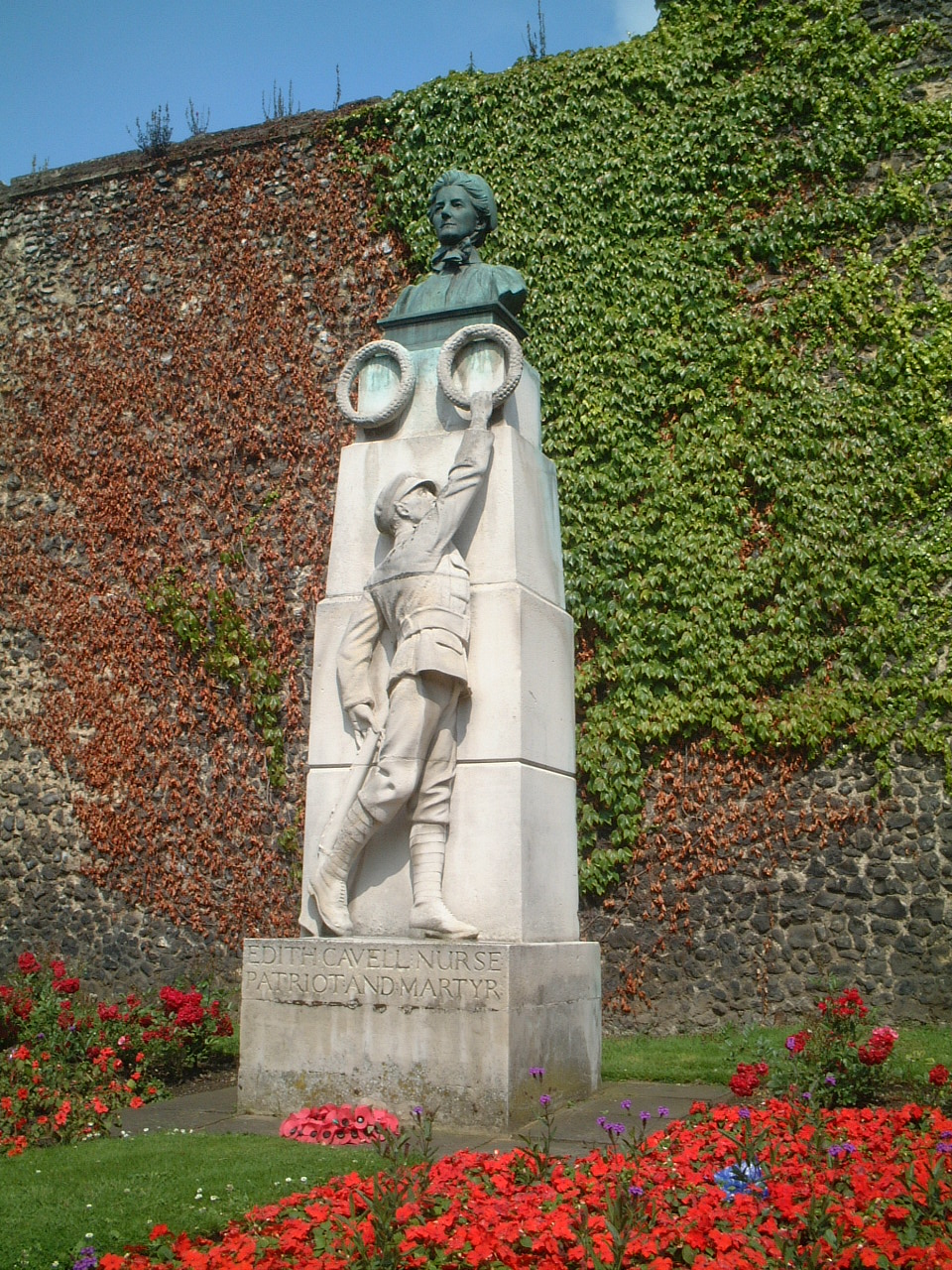
Memorial to Cavell outside Norwich Cathedral

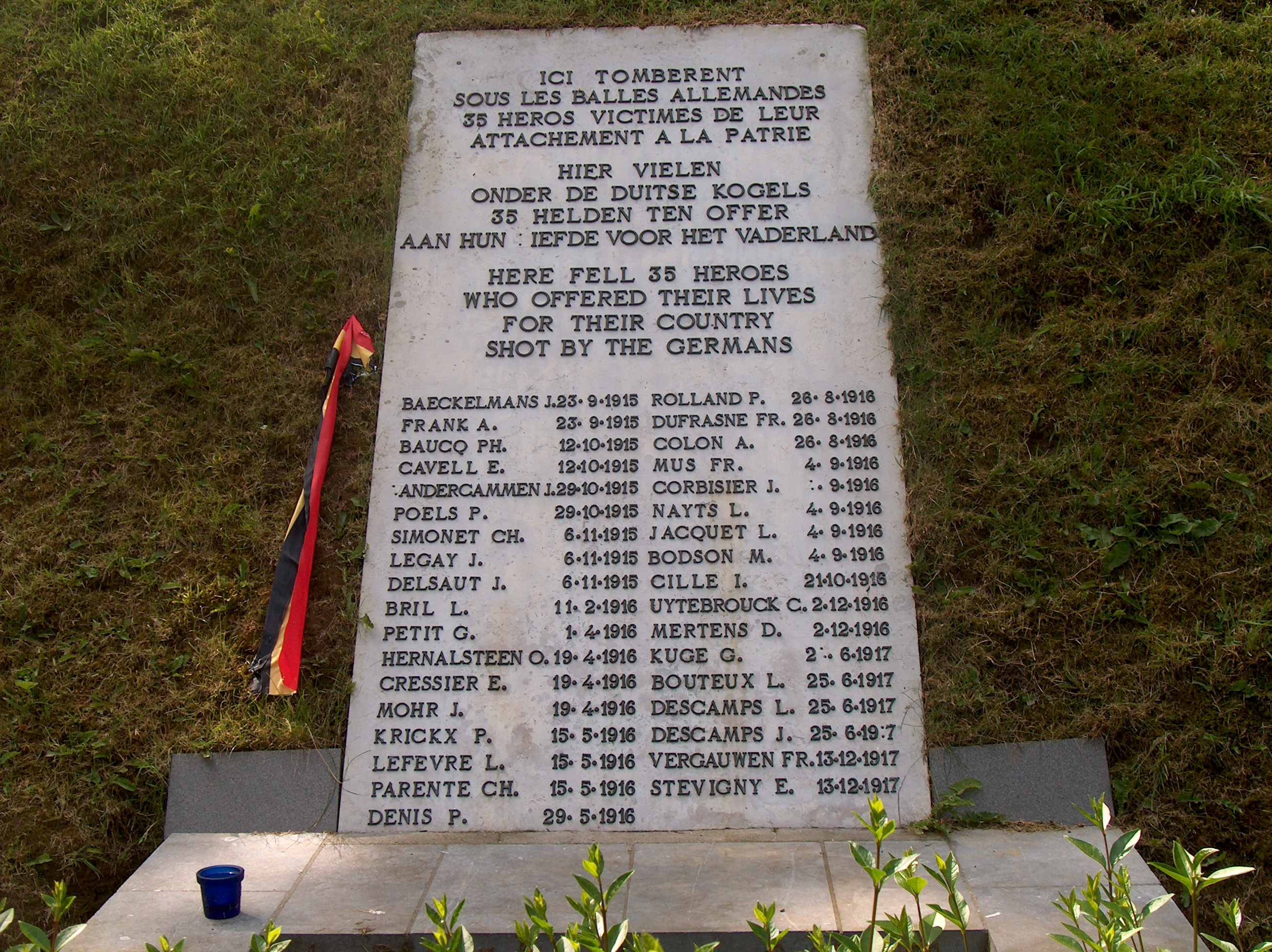
War memorial in Rue Colonel Bourg, Schaerbeek including Cavell's name

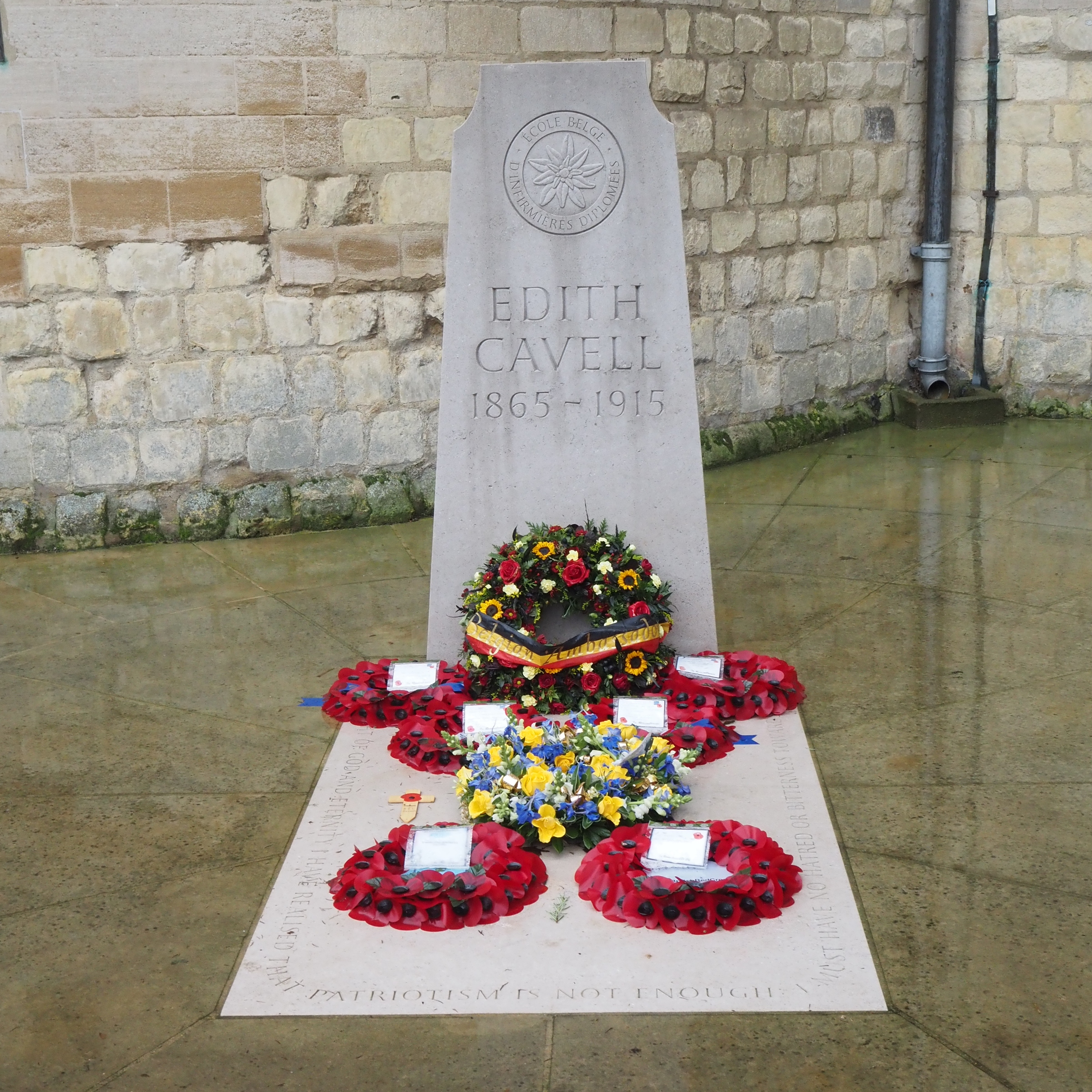
Cavell's grave at Norwich Cathedral, restored in 2016

Cavell's remains were returned to Britain after the war, sailing from Ostend aboard the destroyer HMS Rowena and landing at the Promenade Pier (confusingly known as the Admiralty Pier during WW1 as there was already an Admiralty Pier) in Dover on 14 May 1919. Cavell's was one of only three sets of British remains repatriated following the end of the war, the others being Charles Fryatt and The Unknown Warrior. As the ship arrived, a full peal of Grandsire Triples (5040 Changes, Parker's Twelve-Part) was rung on the bells of St Mary's Church in the town. A plaque commemorating the peal in the church's bell-ringing chamber states it was "Rung with the bells deeply muffled with the exception of the Tenor which was open at back stroke, in token of respect to Nurse Cavell.” Deep (or full) muffling is normally reserved for the deaths of sovereigns. All the ringers were former soldiers, including Frederick W Elliot, formerly King's Royal Rifle Corps, who had been a prisoner of war in Germany for eight months.

Her body was transferred to a railway van and lay in state on the pier overnight before departing from Dover Harbour station for London Victoria station. Becoming known as the Cavell Van, that van is kept as a memorial on the Kent & East Sussex Railway and is usually open to view at Bodiam railway station, though during October 2015 it was placed on display outside the Forum, Norwich. From Victoria the body was processed to Westminster Abbey for a state funeral on 15 May, before finally being reburied at the east side of Norwich Cathedral on 19 May, where a graveside service is still held each October.

== Memorials ==
Following Cavell's death, many memorials were created around the world to remember her.

- A stone memorial, including a statue of Cavell by George Frampton was unveiled in 1920 opposite the entrance to the National Portrait Gallery near Trafalgar Square in London.
- A memorial tower added to St Mary & St George Anglican Church in Jasper, Alberta, Canada was dedicated to her.
- Edith Cavell Bridge, Arthurs Point, Queenstown, New Zealand
- Memorial gardens are dedicated to her in Inverness, Scotland
- Memorial gardens are dedicated to her in Ararat, Victoria, Australia, established by the Mother's Club of the State School in 1931.
- The Edith Cavell Memorial (Melbourne), a bust of her on a stone pedestal, was unveiled in Kings Domain in Melbourne, Australia in 1926.
- A memorial statue by Henry Alfred Pegram was unveiled in 1918 by Queen Alexandra in the grounds of Norwich Cathedral, during the opening of a home for nurses, which also bore her name.
- A memorial bust on Tombland, Norwich, outside Norwich Cathedral.
- Her name is included on the war memorial at Sacred Trinity Church on Chapel Street, Salford where she worshipped.
- She is named on the memorial to the 35 people executed by the German army in Tir national in Schaerbeek, Brussels, Belgium.
- St Mary's Church in Swardeston holds her portrait, and the village holds an annual flower festival on 12 October in her memory.
- A portrait of her is included in the mural of heroic women by Walter P. Starmer unveiled in 1921 in St Jude's Church, Hampstead Garden Suburb, London.
- There are memorial plaques to her in both Peterborough Cathedral, and St Leonard's Hospital, Hackney, London. The Peterborough memorial was designed by Temple Moore and carved by Mahomet Thomas Phillips.
- A blue plaque in West Runton, Norfolk, outside Cumberland Cottage reads "Edith Cavell 1865–1915 Nursing Pioneer Spent Holidays Here 1908–1914".
- A joint memorial to Cavell and Marie Depage by Paul Du Bois is in Brussels
- A stone memorial to her in Paris was one of two statues that Adolf Hitler ordered to be destroyed on his 1940 visit there (the other being that of the French general Charles Mangin).
- In May 2016 a simulation training suite at the University of Salford was jointly named after Cavell and another First World War nurse, Minnie Wood; Diana Souhami, the author of a biography of Cavell, and Dr Claire Chatterton, chair of the Royal College of Nursing’s History of Nursing Society, both gave presentations.
- A memorial to Edith Cavell and Canadian Nurses during The Great War outside the University Street entrance of Toronto General Hospital in Toronto, Ontario, Canada.
- Mount Edith Cavell, Alberta, Canada was named in her memory in 1916.

=== In religion and culture ===
- The French singer Édith Piaf, born two months after Edith Cavell's execution, was named after her. The name "Édith", hitherto rare in France, became more common there after 1915.
- In the Church of England's calendar of saints, the day appointed for the commemoration of Cavell is 12 October. This is a memorial in her honour rather than formal canonisation, and so not a "saint's feast day" in the traditional sense.
- In 2022, Cavell was officially added to the United States Episcopal Church liturgical calendar with a feast day on 12 October.

=== Films, plays and television ===
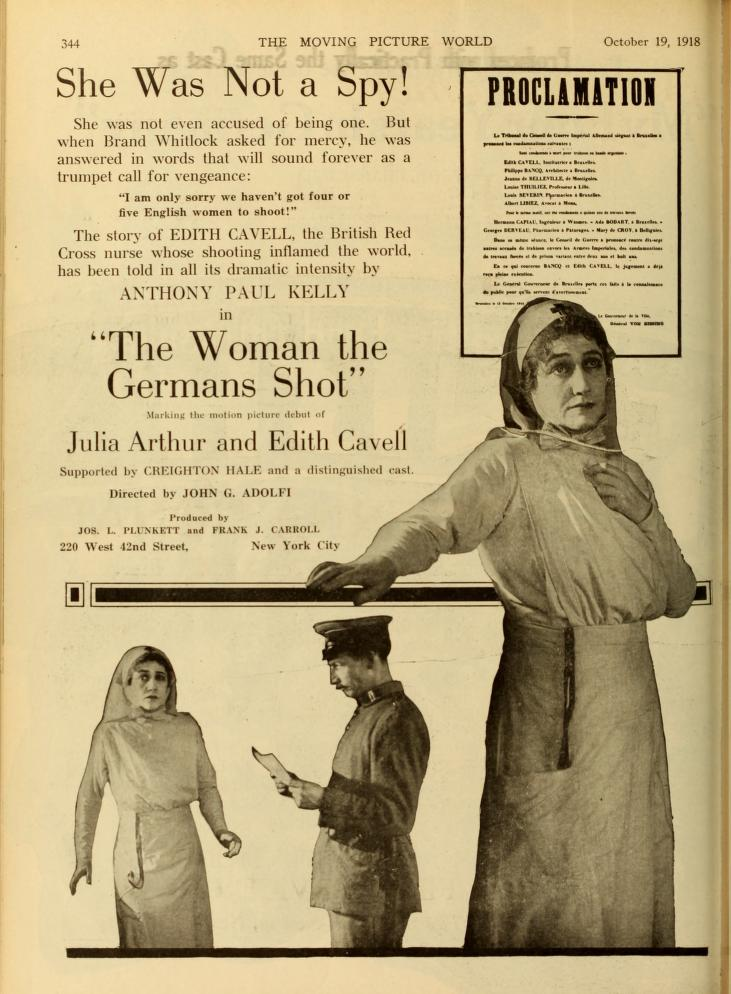
Advertisement for The Woman the Germans Shot

- The first film made of Cavell's life story was the 1916 Australian silent film The Martyrdom of Nurse Cavell soon followed by Nurse Cavell later the same year.
- In 1918 John G. Adolfi directed The Woman the Germans Shot, starring Julia Arthur as Cavell
- In 1925 Eva Elwes wrote a play Edith Cavell, Nurse and Martyr. It was refused a licence by the Lord Chamberlain after consultation with Cavell's sisters. After changes to the title and characters the play was granted a licence as The Price She Paid and performed in 1927.
- Herbert Wilcox made a 1928 silent film called Dawn with Sybil Thorndike. He remade it as Nurse Edith Cavell (1939) starring Anna Neagle and George Sanders.
- Nurse Cavell, a play in three acts, by C. S. Forester with C. E. Bechhofer Roberts opened at the Vaudeville Theatre in London on 7 March 1934, where it ran for 34 performances. The play had first been performed at the Q Theatre in the suburbs.
- Anglia Television produced a black and white documentary about Cavell in 1961, which was presented by Bob Wellings and included interviews with local people who recollected her, contemporary extracts from newspapers and photographs of the Cavell family home.
- In the second episode of the 1980 television series To Serve Them All My Days, Cavell is mentioned in a speech to the school's Officers' Training Corps.
- In Les plus grands Belges ("The Greatest Belgians"), a 2005 television show on the Belgian French-speaking public channel RTBF, the audience voted Cavell the 48th-greatest Belgian.
- Patriot, a play by Angela Moffat, premiered at the Grand Theatre Arts Wing, Swansea in October 2014 with Claire Novelli appearing as Cavell. It was produced by Fluellen Theatre Company.

=== Music ===
- Edith Cavell is the third and final opera by Maltese composer Paolino Vassallo (1856–1923). A melodrama in three acts to a libretto by Alfonso Giglio, it received its première at the Royal Opera House, Valletta, Malta, on 21 March 1927, four years after Vassallo's death, and was an immediate success.
- The song "Saint Stephen's End" by the Felice Brothers from their 2008 album The Felice Brothers includes a verse about the death of Cavell.
- The song "Amy Quartermaine" by Manning from the 2011 album Margaret's Children is also based on the life of Cavell.
- The song "Que Sera" on the album Silent June by O'Hooley & Tidow was inspired by the execution of Cavell.
- A patriotic song, "Remember Nurse Cavell" (words by Gordon V. Thompson, music by Jules Brazil) appeared with 1915 British copyright.
- The 2024 song "Portraits of Edith Cavell" by British composer Ryan Linham was commissioned in 2023 by the PTC Record Label and Samantha Barnhart. The piece was commissioned as an effort to further Edith's legacy of heroism and highlight a female historical figure from a time when women around the world were making an impact through service and dedication, but might not have been given the acknowledgement or place in history that they deserved. The song's various movements each depict a part of Edith's unique life through the lens of some of her strongest qualities including service, purpose, dedication, and passion.

=== Centenary ===
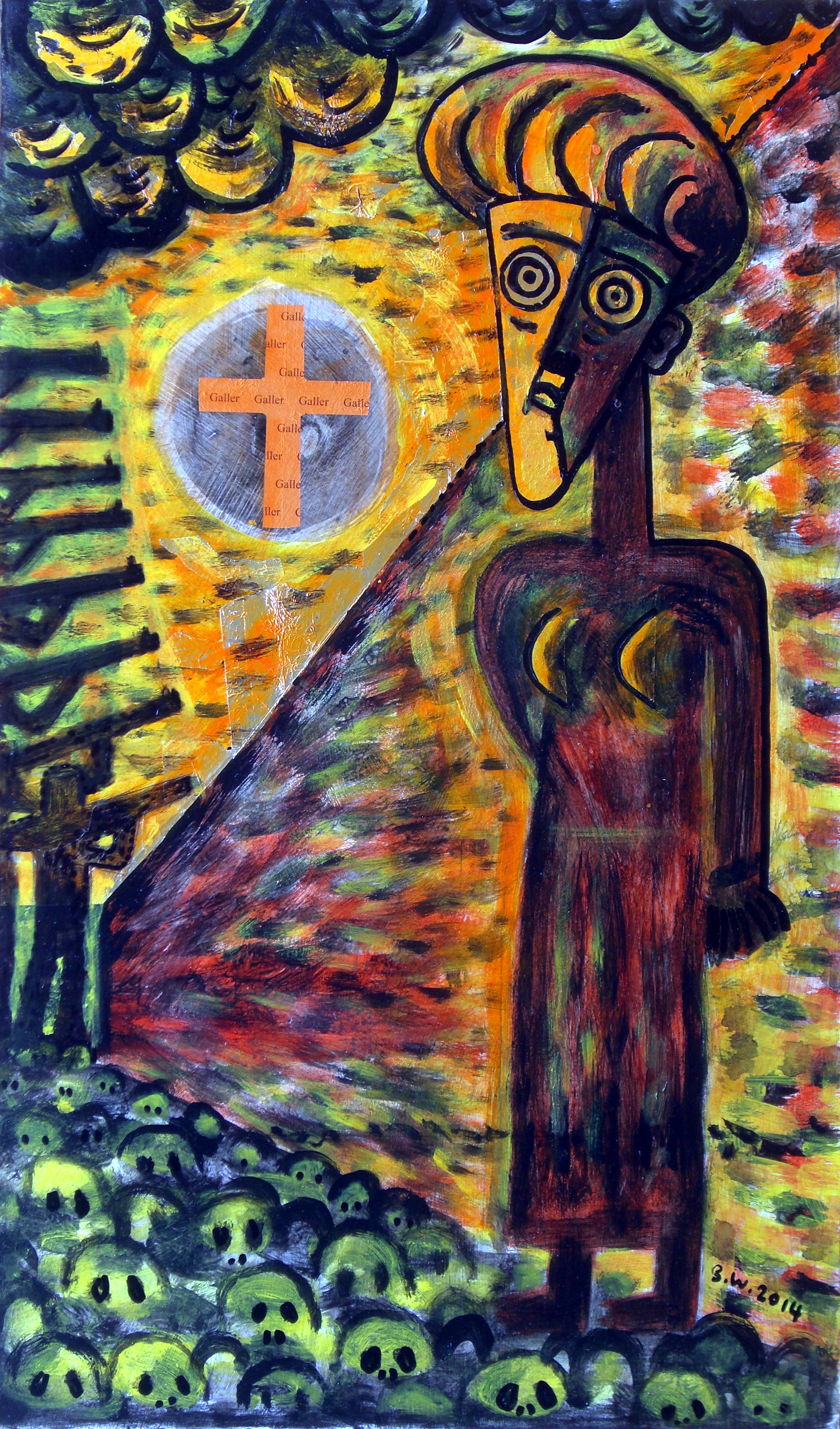
XII – Execution of Edith Cavell, one of 14 paintings on Cavell by Brian Whelan in Norwich Cathedral

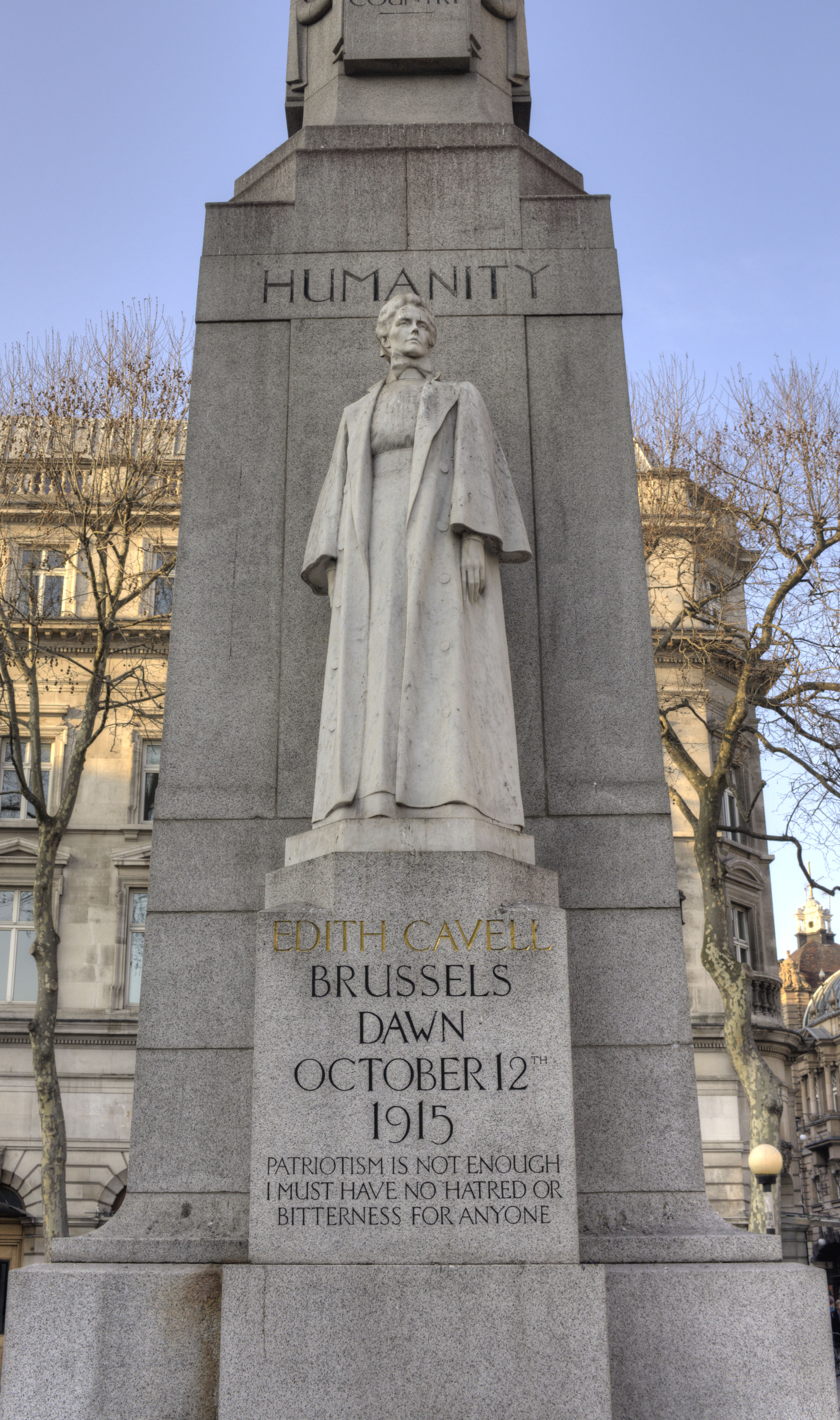
Detail of the Edith Cavell Memorial, St Martin's Place, London

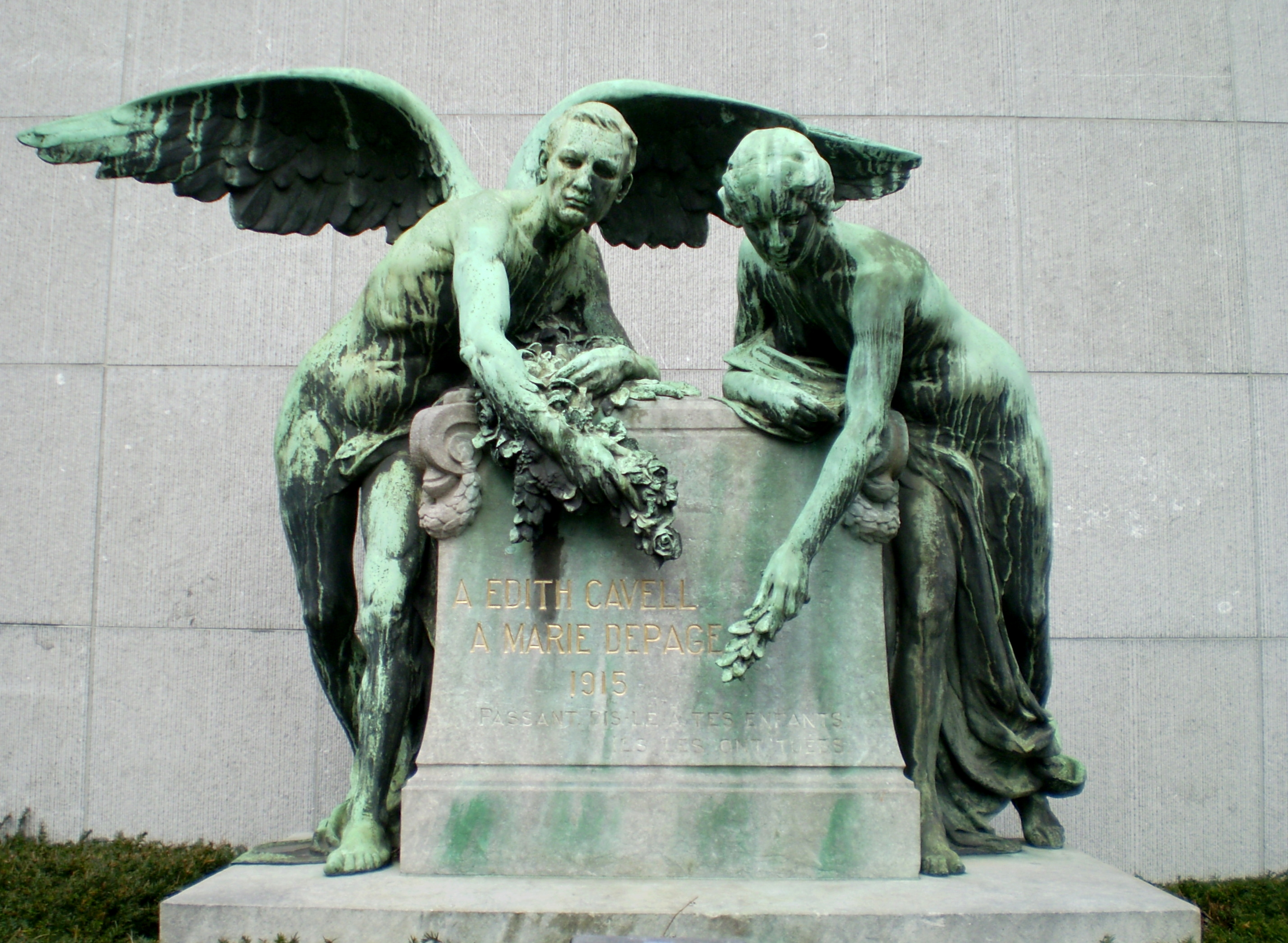
Monument to Edith Cavell and Marie Depage, Brussels

Although the centenary of her death was in 2015, she was also remembered by three new musical pieces in 2014 during commemorations of the outbreak of World War One:

- Standing as I do before God by Cecilia McDowall - an a cappella choral setting of the last reported words of Cavell for soprano solo and five-part choir.
- The Scarlet Flower by Nigel Clarke - a Concertino for Flugelhorn & Strings recorded on Toccata Classics by Longbow String Ensemble.
- An Epitaph for Edith Cavell by Nigel Clarke - a solo violin piece recorded on Toccata Classics by Peter Sheppard Skaerved.

To commemorate the centenary of her death in 2015, work went ahead to restore Cavell's grave in the grounds of Norwich Cathedral after being awarded a £50,000 grant and was completed in 2016. and fourteen paintings by Brian Whelan were commissioned by Norwich Cathedral to commemorate Cavell's life and death. Norwich Cathedral held a memorial service, performed live on BBC Radio 4 on 11 October 2015. In addition to cathedral clergy, guests such as General Richard Dannatt, and actress Matilda Ziegler performed various spoken vignettes organised by Canon Peter Doll. Anto Morra sang unaccompanied his "Edith Louisa Cavell" lyrics to a tune written by Percy Paradise.

The centenary was also marked by two new musical compositions. The 40-minute oratorio Eventide: In Memoriam Edith Cavell by Patrick Hawes premiered in Norwich Cathedral in July 2014 and had its London premiere in St Clement Danes, The Strand, London on 12 October 2015, the exact centenary of her death. The Belgian Edith Cavell Commemoration Group also commissioned a 20-minute-long setting of the Latin Mass by David Mitchell for the centenary - it premiered in Holy Trinity Pro-Cathedral, Brussels on 10 October 2015, in the same choir stalls where Cavell sang in 1915, with Haydn's Missa in Angustiis also performed at the same concert.

Cavell was featured on a UK commemorative £5 coin, part of a set issued in 2015 by the Royal Mint to mark the centenary of the war. On 12 October that year a bust in the Montjoiepark in Uccle, Belgium, was inaugurated by Anne, Princess Royal and Princess Astrid of Belgium. 2015 also saw a tombstone-shaped monument erected in the memorial garden dedicated to her in Inverness.

On the centenary of her execution, an event funded by the University of Salford took place at Sacred Trinity where historian Sir Ian Kershaw and Christine Hallett of the UK Centre for the History of Nursing and Midwifery, spoke.

The memorial on her grave was renewed in 2016. On 4 December 2018 a Google Doodle was created to celebrate her 153rd birthday. The centenary of her repatriation in May 2019 was marked by another half-muffled peal of bells at St Martin's Church in Dover.

== Further Information ==
A film was made of Cavell's funeral procession in Norwich. It is silent and lasts just over nine minutes. It is held by the East Anglian Film Archive and can be viewed here https://eafa.org.uk/work/?id=1630 The content of the film is described in detail in the same source, noting that many nurses and Voluntary Aid Detachment (VAD) personnel were present. It also has background information on Cavell's life.

== See also ==
- Cavell Nurses' Trust
- Edith Cavell Healthcare Campus
- Edith Cavell Hospital
- Louise de Bettignies, a French spy arrested by the Germans who died in captivity in 1918
- Mata Hari, a Dutch dancer and courtesan executed by the French in 1917, on charges of spying for Germany
- Gabrielle Petit, a Belgian nurse executed by the German army for spying for Britain in 1916
- Andrée de Jongh, a Belgian nurse who, inspired by Cavell, in the Second World War created the Comète Line to repatriate Allied airmen
- Masha Bruskina, a Belarusian nurse executed by the Germans in 1941 for helping soldiers to escape.

== Sources ==
- Aldgate, Anthony; Robertson, James C. (2005). Censorship in theatre and cinema. Edinburgh: Edinburgh University Press. ISBN 0-7486-1960-7.
- Alhadeff, Peter (7 October 2015). "Edith Cavell Centenary – Remembrance at Norwich Cathedral October 2015". www.centenarynews.com. Archived from the original on 22 December 2018.
- "WW1 nurse Edith Cavell to feature on new £5 coin". BBC News. 5 July 2014.
- "Edith Cavell grave in Norwich to be restored". BBC News. 13 October 2014.
- "Edith Cavell choral work Eventide world premiere in Norwich". BBC News. 12 July 2014c.
- "Edith Cavell's railway carriage displayed in Norfolk for first time". BBC News. 4 October 2015.
- Benn, Gottfried (2013). Selected Poems and Prose. Translated by Paisey, David. Carcanet Press. ISBN 978-1-84777-150-6.
- Bevans, Charles Irving (1968). Treaties and Other International Agreements of the United States of America, 1776–1949: Multilateral, 1918–1930: 1918–1930. Department of State.
- Nurse Cavell Memorial 1920 (Black and White) (News Reel). London: British Pathe. 1920.
- Daunton, Claire (1990). Her life and Her Art. The Royal London Hospital.
- Duffy, Michael (22 August 2009). "Primary Documents – Maitre G. de Leval on the Execution of Edith Cavell, 12 October 1915". firstworldwar.com.
- Chisholm, Hugh, ed. (1922). "Cavell, Edith" . Encyclopædia Britannica (12th ed.). London & New York: The Encyclopædia Britannica Company.
- Gahan, H. Stirling (Rev'd) (1923). "Account by Reverend H. Stirling Gahan on the Execution of Edith Cavell". firstworldwar.com.
- Gahan, H. Stirling (Rev'd) (1925). "The Execution of Edith Cavell". America; Great Crises in Our History Told by Its Makers: A Library of Original Sources ... Vol. XI. Americanization Department, Veterans of Foreign Wars of the United States.
- Gazet, David (12 October 2015). "Remembering Edith Cavell: WW1 nurse heroine who battled Maidstone's Typhoid outbreak". KentOnline.
- Gibson, Hugh (1917). A Journal from our Legation (the American Legation) in Belgium... Illustrated from photographs. Hodder & Stoughton.
- Goodwin, Doris Kearns (1994). No Ordinary Time: Franklin and Eleanor Roosevelt: The Home Front in World War II. Simon & Schuster. ISBN 978-0-671-64240-2.
- "Edith Cavell's 153rd Birthday". www.google.com.
- Grant, Sally (1995). Edith Cavell 1865–1915. Dereham, Norfolk: Larks Press.
- Hoehling, A A (October 1957). "The Story of Edith Cavell". The American Journal of Nursing. 57 (10). Lippincott Williams & Wilkins: 1320–22. doi:10.2307/3461516. JSTOR 3461516. PMID 13469875.
- Hughes, Anne-Marie Claire (2005). "War, Gender and National Mourning: The Significance of the Death and Commemoration of Edith Cavell in Britain". European Review of History. 12 (3): 425–44. doi:10.1080/13507480500428938. S2CID 159936218.
- Hull, Isabel V. (2014). A Scrap of Paper: Breaking and Making of International Law during the Great War. Cornell University Press. ISBN 978-0-8014-5273-4.
- Judson, Helen (July 1941). "Edith Cavell". The American Journal of Nursing. 41 (7). Lippincott Williams & Wilkins: 871. doi:10.2307/3415077. JSTOR 3415077.
- KCACR Roll of Honour, Kent County Association of Change Ringers
- Klein, Henri F. (1920). "Cavell, Edith" . In Rines, George Edwin (ed.). Encyclopedia Americana.
- Macdonell, Sir John, KCB (chair) (26 February 1920). First, Second and Third Interim Reports from the Committee of Enquiry into Breaches of the Laws of War, with Appendices. Cabinet Office: CAB 24/111/13 (Report). pp. 419–28. "From These considerations it follows that the Feldgericht was justified in finding that Miss Cavell had committed the offence with which she was charged, and that it had power under the German law with which it was administering to condemn her to death. [p. 424]"
- Mitchell, David (2015). "Cavell Mass". Campbell/Bright Morning Star. Archived from the original on 20 June 2015.
- Monument Australia (2017). "Nurse Edith Cavell". www.monumentaustralia.org.au.
- "Seeks Release as Betrayer of Cavell". The Mount Washington News. 23 February 1934.
- Norton-Taylor, Richard (12 October 2005). "How British diplomats failed Edith Cavell". The Guardian.
- "Nurse Edith Cavell". Norwich Cathedral. Archived from the original on 3 February 2021.
- O'Hooley, Belinda (February 2011). "O'Hooley & Tidow: unconventional and experimental folk". Muso's magazine.
- "Alleged Betrayer Freed". Palm Beach Daily News. 10 March 1936.
- Right dear in the sight of the Lord is the death of His Saints. Peterborough Cathedral.
- Peterson, Horace Cornelius (1939). Propaganda for war: the campaign against American neutrality, 1914–1917. Associated Faculty Press, Incorporated. ISBN 9780804603652.
- Peterson, Moya (2018). "Edith Cavell – Nurse and Martyr". University of Kansas School of Nursing. Archived from the original on 11 October 2018.
- Rankin, Nicholas (2008). A Genius for Deception: How Cunning Helped the British Win Two World Wars. Oxford University Press. ISBN 978-0-19-976917-9.
- Reuter's (18 March 1920). "Statue of Edith Cavell". Barrier Miner. Vol. 33, no. 9837. Broken Hill, NSW, Australia.
- Roberts, Carl Eric Bechhofer; Forester, Cecil Scott (1933). Nurse Cavell: A Play in Three Acts. John Lane.
- Scovil, Elisabeth Robinson (November 1915). "An Heroic Nurse". The American Journal of Nursing. 16 (2). Lippincott Williams & Wilkins: 118–21. doi:10.2307/3406248. JSTOR 3406248.
- Singh, Anita (12 September 2015). "Revealed: New evidence that executed wartime nurse Edith Cavell's network was spying". The Telegraph.
- Smith, Cindi (March 1985). A Parish History of the Church of St. Mary and St. George, Jasper, Alberta. Jasper Yellowhead Historical Society.
- "Edith Cavell Memorial". Victorian Heritage Database. State Government of Victoria. Archived from the original on 6 February 2021.
- "Court Circular". The Times. London. 14 October 1918.
- Unger, Abraham (23 September 1997). "Edith Cavell". HistoryNet. Archived from the original on 11 March 2018.
- Watson, Greig (24 February 2014). "World War One: Edith Cavell and Charles Fryatt 'martyred'". BBC News.
- Walker, Alan (April 2015a). "Walter Percival Starmer: Artist 1877–1961". Archived from the original on 1 August 2019.
- Walker, Alan (31 July 2015b). "Campaign from on high at St Jude's". Church Times.
- Whelan, Brian (2015). "In the Footsteps of a Martyr". The Tablet.
- Zimmermann, Alfred (1916). "A Defense of the Execution". The New York Times Current History. Vol. 3. New York Times Company.
