= Louise Thuliez =

French schoolteacher, resistance fighter and author (1881–1966)

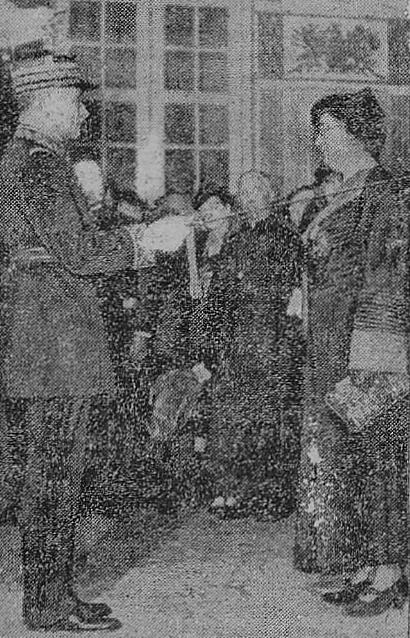
- Thuliez (right) in 1935
- Born: 12 December 1881; Preux-au-Bois, France
- Died: 10 October 1966 (aged 84); Paris, France
- Occupations: School teacher; resistance fighter; author

Louise Thuliez (12 December 1881 – 10 October 1966) was a French schoolteacher, resistance fighter during World War I and World War II and author.

== Life and career ==
Thuliez was born in Preux-au-Bois, northern France on 12 December 1881.

When World War I broke out, Thuliez was working as a teacher in Saint-Waast-la Vallée. She became part of an underground network that helped allied soldiers who were trapped behind enemy lines to get out of Belgium and into Holland. She worked closely with Edith Cavell, Philippe Baucq and Princess Marie of Croÿ.

By the time German authorities closed in on the network, they had rescued around 200 soldiers. Thuliez was the first to be arrested, along with Philippe Baucq on 31 July 1915. She was sentenced to death by German court martial but the sentence was later reduced to life in prison due to the intervention of Alfonso XIII of Spain. She was imprisoned in Saint-Gilles prison in Brussels and released on 8 November 1918.

Thuliez published a book in 1933 on her experiences in prison, titled Condemned to Death which won a Montyon Prize in 1935.

Thuliez worked with Princess Marie de Croÿ again during World War II. Thuliez helped Allied soldiers escape from the Auvergne region of occupied France while de Croÿ hid soldiers in a château in Bellignies.

She died in Paris on 10 October 1966. In 1970, a statue of Thuliez was erected in Preux-au-Bois and a street in Paris was named after her in 1974.
