= Ethel Armstrong =

British radiographer (1930–2020)

Ethel Armstrong MBE
- Born: Ethel Garthwaite; 4 August 1930; Durham, England
- Died: 6 August 2020 (aged 90)
- Occupation: Radiographer
- Medical career
- Field: Radiography, Nursing
- Notable works: Co-patron of the NHS Retirement Fellowship

Ethel Armstrong MBE (née Garthwaite; 4 August 1930 – 6 August 2020) was a British radiographer. She began working for the National Health Service (NHS) on the day it was established, 5 July 1948, and subsequently played a key role in establishing the NHS Retirement Fellowship.

== Early life and education ==
Ethel Garthwaite was born in Durham on 4 August 1930. She attended school until the age of 17, then her headmaster recommended that she get a job rather than continue in the sixth form. She was unable to attend university as there were no grants for women to study dentistry or medicine.

== Career ==
On leaving school, Armstrong worked at a large mental health hospital in Newcastle as a "cadet" where she experienced several different departments. Once she was 18 she was able to join the school of radio diagnosis, on the same day as the birth of the NHS: 5 July 1948.

She primarily worked in radiography and radiotherapy from this point forward. Armstrong worked with John Charnley during his early work on hip operations, before he received his knighthood.

Armstrong worked as a tutor and advisor to the Liverpool Breast Screening Service until 1989, when she retired. At the time that she worked for the service, it was an experimental unit and only adopted across the NHS in the 1980s.

During the course of her work, Armstrong earned a master's degree in clinical practice (oncology).

== Voluntary work ==
After retirement, Armstrong returned to Durham and continued her work for the NHS by volunteering for the Durham branch of the NHS Retirement Fellowship. She served as chairman from 1994 to the present. From 2005, she became part of the National Council, and was elected vice chairman in 2009, then chairman in 2011 and president in 2013. Having been involved with the service for so long, Armstrong was invited to become the Retirement Fellowship's first Life Patron in 2015.

Armstrong was also an active member of the Cavell Nurses' Trust. Because of her long career and continued charity work, Armstrong made a guest appearance alongside Simon Stevens, the NHS chief executive, at the Health and Care Innovation Expo 2017.

In March 2018, Armstrong received an MBE for her seven decades of service to the NHS. On receiving the award, Armstrong stated:

The NHS is part of who I am, and I have been proud and lucky enough to have been there at the start of this wonderful institution. It's a particular honour to receive this in the year that the NHS turns 70 and I see this as a nod to all the special people I've had the privilege of working for over the decades.

However, she noted that when the NHS turns 70 it would also be her 70th anniversary, and perhaps time to retire fully.

== Personal life and death ==
Armstrong was married to Harry until his death in 1998. He worked for Hawker Siddeley as a director, which required regular moves around the United Kingdom and led Ethel to work for many different NHS trusts.

Armstrong died on 6 August 2020, two days after her 90th birthday.

== Sources ==
- Jarrold, Ken (12 October 2020). "Ethel Armstrong obituary". The Guardian. ISSN 0261-3077.
