= John Rimington =

John Rimington may refer to:

- John Rimington (civil servant) (born 1935), British civil servant
- John Rimington (politician) (born 1952), Manx politician
