= Václav Jelínek =

Czechoslovak spy (1944–2022)

- Born: 23 August 1944
- Died: 8 February 2022 (aged 77)
- Other names: Erwin van Haarlem
- Occupations: Spy; Art dealer

Václav Jelínek (23 August 1944 – 8 February 2022) was a Cold War era spy for Communist Czechoslovakia, who worked in London under the assumed identity of Erwin van Haarlem.

== Early life ==
Jelínek was born on 23 August 1944 in Modřany near Prague (now part of the city).

The real Erwin van Haarlem was born on 22 August 1944, the son of Johanna van Haarlem, a woman of Dutch and Jewish ancestry who had been raped by Gregor Kulig, a Nazi soldier with whom she had been fraternising. Soon after Erwin's birth, by which time Kulig had already been killed in action, he was placed for adoption in Holešovice, Prague. He was later listed in the Netherlands as a missing person.

== Career ==
After compulsory national service, Jelínek became a sergeant, working for the Ministry of the Interior. He was recruited by the Czechoslovak secret police, the Státní bezpečnost (StB). In 1967 Václav Jelínek was transferred from the V. Directorate (Protection of State and Government Officials) to the I. Directorate of the Security Corps. Shortly afterwards, his special training to become a member of the illegal intelligence started. He was promoted to the rank of lieutenant.

He adopted van Haarlem's identity and moved to London in June 1975, using a genuine Dutch passport, illicitly obtained in van Haarlem's name. He obtained work at the Kensington Hilton Hotel restaurant on Holland Park Avenue, and began spying on the United Kingdom and United States, for the StB and for the KGB, their equivalent in the Soviet Union. His handler was Lieutenant colonel Josef Kafka. Jelínek was decorated by the KGB on 25 March 1986. Although he posed as a Dutch national, he never lived in the Netherlands.

When Johanna van Haarlem contacted him, in 1977, believing him to be her real son, he was ordered to play along, in order not to blow his cover, and did so, even going so far as to visit her family in Holland. As a result of this deception, she was not reunited with her real son until February 1992.

== Arrest and trial ==
Eventually, Jelínek tired of working as a waiter, and, with funding from the StB, bought a flat at Silver Birch Close in Friern Barnet, North London and set up as an art dealer. He was eventually arrested in the flat on 22 April 1988, while in the process of receiving coded messages by radio. His trial for espionage at London's Old Bailey opened on 6 February 1989 and was the first trial of a spy in the United Kingdom since 1961. A Metropolitan Police officer said he was "probably the first person to be tried at the Old Bailey under an alias". Among those to testify against him was Stella Rimington, using the alias "Miss J". The jury returned a guilty verdict after just 45 minutes deliberation, and on 3 March 1989 he was sentenced to ten years imprisonment. He was subsequently held at HM Prison Parkhurst. While he was in Parkhurst, the 1989 Velvet Revolution saw the overthrow of communism in Czechoslovakia. On 1 January 1993, Czechoslovakia peacefully dissolved, with its constituent states becoming the independent states of the Czech Republic and Slovakia. Following an unsuccessful escape attempt and a period on hunger strike, as well as lobbying on his behalf by Czech diplomats, Jelínek was freed on 5 April 1993 and deported to the Czech Republic.

== Life after release ==
In 2006, VPRO, a radio station in the Netherlands, ran a two-part programme about van Haarlem, called Het Spoor Terug (The Trail Back). His memoirs, written up by Jaroslav Kmenta were published in Czech in 2010, under the title Český špion Erwin van Haarlem.

As of 2016, Jelínek was living in Prague.

== Books ==
- Kmenta, Jaroslav (2010). Český špion Erwin van Haarlem (in Czech). Prague: JKM. ISBN 9788090360303. OCLC 70052242.
