= John Howard Locke =

John Howard Locke CB
- Born: 26 December 1923; King's Norton, Warwickshire
- Died: 26 September 1998 (aged 74); Sussex
- Resting place: Angmering, Sussex
- Education: Queen's College, Oxford
- Occupation: Civil servant
- Years active: 1945-1993
- Employer: British civil service
- Organization(s): MAFF, Cabinet Office, MoT, Dept of Employment, HSE
- Spouse: Eirene Sylvia Sykes (m.1948-1998)
- Children: 2 daughters
- Parent(s): Percy John Howard Locke, Josephine Locke
- Honours: Companion of the Bath 1984

John Howard Locke CB (26 December 1923 – 26 September 1998) was a British civil servant in the Department of Employment; the Ministry of Agriculture, Fisheries and Food; the Cabinet Office; and the Ministry of Transport. He was instrumental in implementing and championing the British risk-based approach to workplace health, safety and welfare: through drafting the Health and Safety at Work etc. Act 1974 and as the first director-general of the Health and Safety Executive, the body responsible for enforcing the provisions of the act.

== Early life ==
Locke was born in King’s Norton, Warwickshire, son of Percy John Howard Locke, a silk merchant, and Josephine Locke née Marshfield. He was educated at Hymers College, Hull and Queen’s College, Oxford graduating in 1944 with a first class degree in Philosophy, Politics and Economics.

== Career ==
Locke joined the civil service in 1945 as an Assistant Principal in the Ministry of Agriculture and Fisheries remaining there until 1965. He was promoted to Under-Secretary and worked in the Cabinet Office from 1965 to 1966. Thomas Balogh, the economic advisor in the Cabinet Office, recommended Locke to Barbara Castle, the Minister of Transport; she ‘lured’ Under-Secretary Locke to the Ministry of Transport. She noted that he ‘entered fully into the spirit of our transport policy’ and worked on the rationalisation and expansion of passenger transport services under public ownership.

=== Department of Employment ===
His administrative abilities so impressed Barbara Castle, that she took Locke with her when she was transferred to the Department of Employment and Productivity in 1968. The Equal Pay Bill was a key piece of legislation occupying the department in late 1969. Castle acknowledged that John Locke had done an excellent job in drafting the Bill. As he had initially drafted it, the Bill defined ‘equal pay for the same work’, but after discussions with Castle the definition ‘same work’ was changed to ‘like work of the same or broadly similar nature’. Another key document was the Prices and Incomes white paper. The Chancellor, Roy Jenkins, wanted the text to include a statement to the effect that the low paid should only be entitled to higher pay to give then ‘reasonable’ standards. Castle noted that ‘John Locke and I are determined not to include anything so nonsensical’. In Cabinet on Thursday 4 December 1969 the Chancellor and Harold Lever strongly opposed aspects of the paper. It was agreed that officials should meet to agree the draft. Castle told Locke to get cracking at once but ‘not to yield anything of substance’. Locke and Castle went through what had been agreed over the weekend, and the paper ‘sailed’ through Cabinet on Monday 8 December. A press conference was held on 28 January 1970 for which Locke had produced a background document. Castle thought this was an excellent paper and noted ‘He really is bright, that boy!’ (Locke was aged 46). The Equal Pay Act 1970 (c. 41) received Royal Assent on 29 May 1970. Its long title was ‘An Act to prevent discrimination, as regards terms and conditions of employment, between men and women.’

=== Industry pay dispute ===
In 1971 Locke was promoted to Deputy-Secretary and remained in the Department of Employment from 1971 to 1974 under the Conservative Administration. He was secretary to Lord Wilberforce's court of inquiry into the electricity industry pay dispute in 1971. This was an unusually senior appointment for such a role and demonstrates the seriousness of the situation for the government. Negotiations between the industry and the unions had broken down in December 1970 and the unions had taken industrial action which led to major disruption of electricity supplies and the government had declared a state of emergency. The Wilberforce court of inquiry was held in the week of 18 January and its report was published on 10 February 1971. The report noted that the majority of workers in the industry had not, between 1964 and 1969, been adequately compensated for changes to working conditions. The report recommended pay increases of £105 a year and an extra £35 a year for craftsmen and foremen plus improved shift payments and three additional days' holiday. The recommendations were incorporated in an agreement on 22 March.

=== Manpower services ===
Locke was largely responsible for drafting the Employment and Training Act 1973 which established the Manpower Services Commission; and personally would have wished to head the Commission although his career took another direction. He was also responsible for reorganising the Department of Employment, including the Employment Service, the Training Service and Unemployment Benefit Service.

=== Workplace health, safety and welfare ===
Locke's major achievements were implementing the recommendations of the 1972 Robens Report on occupational safety and health by transposing it into statute as the Health and Safety at Work etc. Act 1974; and leading the Health and Safety Executive for nine years.

The Robens Report had noted the humanitarian cost – 1,000 fatalities and half a million injuries a year – of the existing "bloated, fragmented, reactive and overly prescriptive system". This would be replaced with redistribution of responsibilities away from statutory regulation to "those who create the risks and those who work with them". Robens believed the role of the state was to facilitate good practice, establishing and strengthening the arrangements through which self-regulation could thrive. However, this entailed considerable change within the machinery of government. From 1972 to 1974 Locke was involved in a "prolonged and intensive period of interdepartmental consultation" on the new arrangements; as the Secretary of State for Employment, Michael Foot, said: "what that means is that there was a first-class Whitehall row", as Departments resisted the transfer of their health and safety functions to a new quasi-independent authority. Locke's "blend of creativity and steel" was deployed effectively to fuse together 13 organisations from six ministries. He took over as Director of Occupational Safety and Health in the Department of Employment with the Chief Inspector of Factories and the Chief Employment Medical Adviser reporting to him. He also acted as chairman of the shadow management board for the new Health and Safety Executive established by the 1974 Act.

=== The Health and Safety Commission and Executive ===
The Robens Report had envisaged the responsibility for health and safety would be vested in a single institution, the National Authority for Safety and Health at Work. However, Locke was instrumental in creating two new agencies instead of the single authority. The Health and Safety Commission (HSC) developed health and safety policy: it was a tripartite organisation incorporating the interests of employees, employers and the public; realised through trade unions, employers organisations, and local authorities and professional bodies. The Health and Safety Executive (HSE) was, legally, a three-person body corporate, comprising a director-general and two deputy directors-general, its operational arm comprised officials enforcing the law, undertaking research and publicity and providing advice to the HSC. Locke was the first director-general of the Health and Safety Executive from its establishment on 1 January 1975 until December 1983. He actively promoted the regulatory model established by the Health and Safety at Work etc. Act by publishing papers, giving lectures, and contributing to contemporary debates on safety issues and health concerns.

In June 1978 the HSE published the Canvey Report. This was the product of an investigation of the potential hazards from operations in the Canvey Island and Thurrock. Locke, together with Lois Audrey Pittom, the HSE Chairman Bill Simpson and others, attended a public meeting on Canvey to explain the report. Locke and Pittom made ‘workmanlike presentations’ but made ‘inadequate attempts’ to explain levels of risk and to relate them to everyday experience. They presented the report in a way that would be understood by an ‘intelligent and objective observer’. However, one attendee noted that the HSE had ‘over-estimated the intelligence of the audience’ and had failed to understand the extent to which the audience had already made up their minds about the developments.

=== Career appraisal and legacies ===
Locke retired from the civil service in December 1983. Michael Foot, then Leader of the Opposition, paid tribute to him in Parliament, saying: "John Locke was one of the great civil servants, and without his inspiration and drive we would not have been able to establish the [Health and Safety] Commission in that way. His work has been of outstanding importance to the Commission".

David Eves, a Deputy director-general of the HSE, commented on John Locke’s character: “John Locke was a clever and determined senior civil servant with a reputation for ruthlessness; inevitably he made enemies in Whitehall as he wore down Departmental opposition and drew the Executive’s resources together.” In addition to HM Factory Inspectorate, the staff of several inspectorates transferred to HSE in 1975. These included the Explosives Inspectorate, the Employment Medical Advisory Service, Nuclear Installations Inspectorate, Mines and Quarries Inspectorate, Safety in Mines Research Establishment, the British Approvals Service for Electrical Equipment in Flammable Atmospheres (BASEEFA), the Alkali and Clean Air Inspectorate. John Locke was succeeded as director-general by John Rimington. “Rimington set about mending fences that Locke had forced down in Whitehall when gathering the various Departmental Inspectorates together under the Executive’s wing”.

Ministers are responsible to Parliament for success or failure in health and safety at work. John Locke once said to a Minister, ‘We’ll know how good you are when you have to respond to your first disaster’.

His successor as director-general, John Rimington, said that Locke was the first official to realise the importance of the professionalisation of occupational safety and health and "put his effort where his mouth was in helping, playing a leading part ... in the development of the framework for professional testing and examination". Locke did a "good deal to maintain and improve the professional status" of safety advisers in the face of scepticism by some in the business community that advisers were "interpreting rules too strictly and making unnecessary and expensive demands". Three years after retiring he accepted the unpaid chairmanship of the National Examination Board in Occupational Safety and Health until September 1993. He was a director of the Institution of Occupational Safety and Health until November 1993. He was also invited by the Australian Government to advise on setting up a safety executive.

Locke was made a Companion of the Order of the Bath in the New Year honours list 1984.

== Personal life ==
Locke married the architect Eirene Sylvia Sykes (21 September 1921 – 5 August 2012) daughter of Francis Adam and Dorothy Sykes, in the Methodist church Hinde Street Marylebone, London, on 17 July 1948. They had two daughters, Diana R.C. Locke and (Carol) Imogen H. Locke.

His hobbies included hill-walking, gardening, and contemporary opera. His dress style – Mao-style tunics, kaftans and mauve suits – sometimes amused or disconcerted conservative civil servants and business leaders. In 1939 he was a scholar living with the Tinson family at Homes Burnby Lane Pocklington Yorkshire. His address in 1948 was 73 Philbeach Gardens, Earls Court London; then 4 Old Palace Terrace, Richmond, Surrey; and Box Trees, 8 Sea Road, East Preston, Sussex, BN16 1JP. He died in Sussex and was buried on 7 October 1998 in St. Margaret’s churchyard Angmering, Sussex. His Will was made on 20 July 1993, probate of his estate was granted in Brighton on 4 February 1999.

== See also ==
- Health and Safety at Work etc. Act 1974
- Health and Safety Commission
- Health and Safety Executive
- Institution of Occupational Safety and Health
- Manpower Services Commission
