= Lois Audrey Pittom =

British Civil Servant

Lois Audrey Pittom BA CB
- Born: 4 July 1918; Barby Northamptonshire
- Died: 5 April 1990 (aged 71); Daventry District Northamptonshire
- Other name: known as Audrey Pittom
- Education: Laurels School Warwick, St Anne's College Oxford
- Occupations: Civil servant, Inspector of Factories, Superintending Inspector, Deputy Chief Inspector of Factories, Under-Secretary in the Health and Safety Executive
- Years active: 1945 to 1978
- Employer: HM Government
- Parent(s): Thomas Pittom and Hylda Pittom
- Honours: Companion of the Bath

Lois Audrey Pittom (4 July 1918 — 5 April 1990), known as Audrey Pittom, was a British Civil Servant; her career included roles as an Inspector of Factories, Deputy Chief Inspector of Factories, Under-Secretary in the Health and Safety Executive, Department of Employment.

== Education ==
Pittom was educated at Laurels School, Wroxall Abbey, Warwick; and St Anne's College, Oxford, where she was awarded a BA (Hons) degree in 1939.

== Career ==
Audrey Pitton was appointed as an Inspector of Factories in 1945; she was promoted to Superintending Inspector, Nottingham, in 1967; Deputy Chief Inspector of Factories in 1970; and Under-Secretary in the Health and Safety Executive, Department of Employment in 1975.

Pittom had an interest in ergonomics and occupational health and had the nickname “Seats Pittom”.

When she was appointed Under-Secretary in the 1970s she said: “If you really want to give health a boost it must come first in the title”. Her concern was the long-term occupational health effects on workers as well as from the risks posed by accidents. In 1977 upon the introduction of a scheme under which toxic properties of substances would be legally notifiable, she wrote “In the past, a number of substances have been introduced which have subsequently proved to have tragic and sometimes fatal effects, perhaps long after they have first been used. In introducing this scheme, we are concerned with the health of those at work not only today but also in the future”.

It is reputed that the title of the Health and Safety at Work etc. Act 1974, and the wider use of the term ‘Health and Safety’ was coined by Pittom. She was appointed Under-Secretary in charge of health policy when the Health and Safety Executive was formed in 1975. Formally the Heath and Safety Executive was a 3-person body corporate comprising a Director General, a Deputy Director General and a third senior official. The first post-holders were John Howard Locke (DG); Bryan Hugh Harvey (DDG) and Audrey Pittom head of the Hazardous Substances Branch.

Pittom was deputy chair of the committee established after the Flixborough Disaster in 1974 where 28 people were killed. She was also Director for Hazardous Substances for the Ministry of Health.

Pittom was one of the signatories of the 1978 Canvey Report which investigated the hazards from various industrial activities on Canvey Island.

Audrey Pittom became a Member of the Association of University Women in 1966. She remained active in her local Association after her retirement.

== Retirement ==
She retired from the civil service on 1 July 1978 when she was 60.

Following her retirement, she was a parish councillor for the Parish of Barby, Northamptonshire.

She was appointed Companion of the Bath (CB) in the New Year Honours 1979.

== Personal ==
Lois Audrey Pittom was born in Barby Northamptonshire, the second of three daughters of Thomas Pittom, farmer and landowner, and his wife Hylda (née Ashby). The other daughters were Hylda E. Pittom born in Rugby District in 1915 and Gillian Mary Pittom born in Rugby District on 26 November 1923.

She gave her recreations as gardening and sight-seeing in Europe.

After retiring she lived at 1 Rectory Lane, Barby, Northamptonshire where she died of cancer on 5 April1990. Her funeral service was held at Barby parish church on 12 April 1990 followed by cremation.

Audrey Pittom never married.

Her estate was valued at £268,479 when probate was granted in July 1990. Charities received a total of £18,000.

== See also ==
- John Howard Locke
- Health and Safety Executive
