= Anto Morra =

London Irish punk folk singer

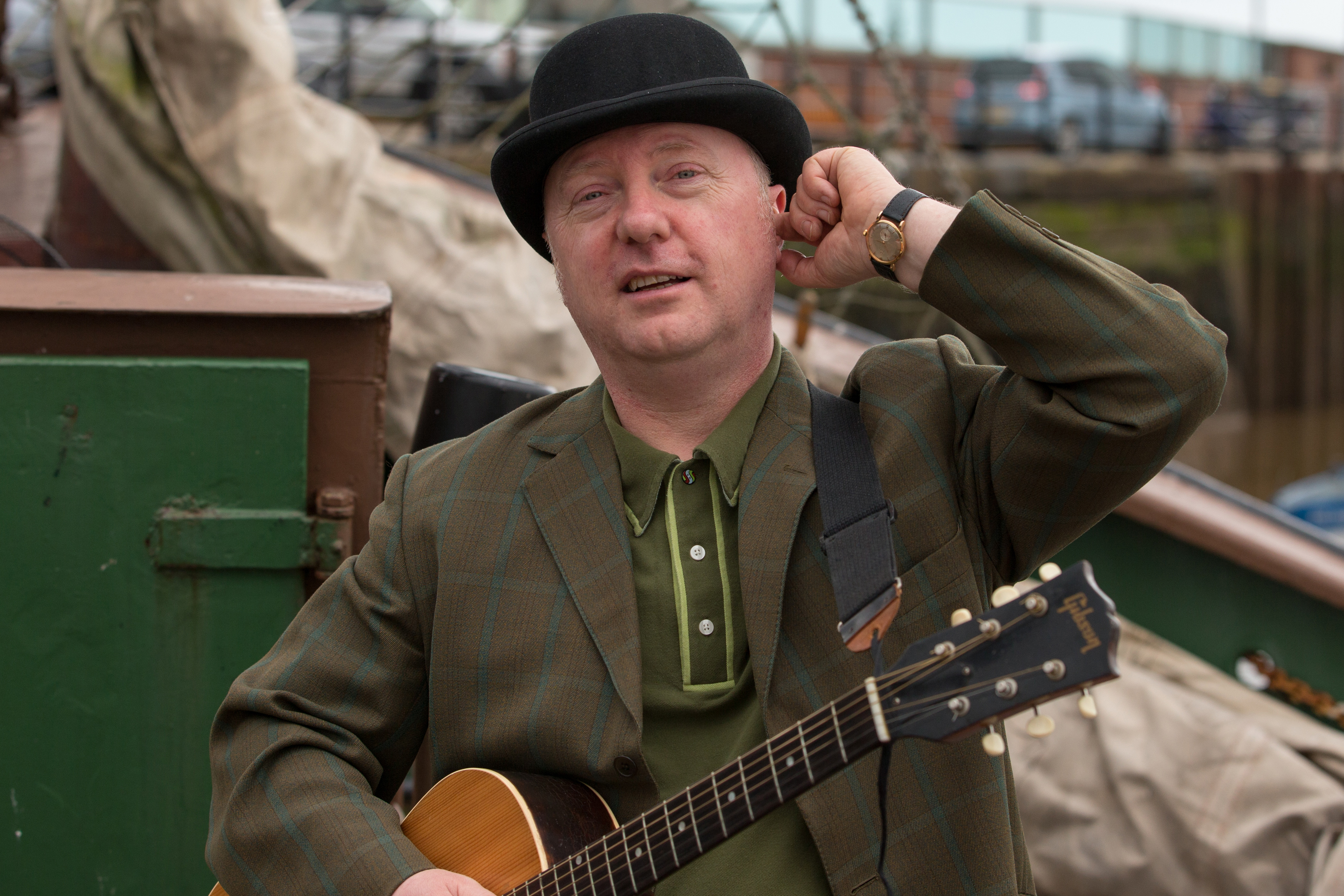

Anthony James Morrissey is a London Irish, Punk Folk singer, songwriter and artist. He lives in East Anglia and is a regular performer on the Norfolk Folk Roots and acoustic music scene, and occasionally on the London Celtic Punks scene. Morra is second cousin to the English singer Morrissey.

Morra is part of the 'who's who of the London Irish scene and is often called upon to sing and play at significant events. It was at Morra's launch of his 2014 EP 'The Patriot' where a tribute to recovering Paul Mad Dog Mcguinness (of the famous Shane MacGowan and The Popes band lore) was held.

On 1 January 2020 Morra released 'Twenty' a compilation of 20 songs exclusively for download and streaming services. The songs originated from six physical (Vinyl /CD) releases produced earlier.

In April 2017 he played at the "Backward Glance" movie fundraiser for filmmaker David P. Kelly on the work of London Irish painter Bernard Canavan.

Also in 2017 Morra initiated a project to introduce 'folk music to the punks and punk to the folkies' through a four-piece band in Norfolk called the 'Punkfolkers'. The Punkfolkers headlined in 2018 at various UK folk festivals including King Lynn's 'Folk In the Town'.

Following his cappella (unaccompanied solo) at the Norwich Cathedral Centenary Service of Edith Cavell in October 2015, Morra released his album on the famous martyr, "Patriotism is not enough" Staying with the English female martyrdom theme, Morra released his album "Boudicca’s Country" collaborating with Gareth Calway on lyrics.
