= Secret Asset =

2006 novel by Stella Rimington

- First edition
- Author: Stella Rimington
- Language: English
- Subject: Fiction
- Published: 2006, Hutchinson
- Media type: Print
- Pages: 448
- ISBN: 0-09-180024-2

Secret Asset is a novel by Stella Rimington, released in 2006.

== Plot ==
The story, the second in the 'Liz Carlyle' series, is initially divided between two threads: The suspicion of an unactivated IRA mole within MI5, and a potential, terrorist threat reported by an unpaid agent. As the book progresses, the two sub threads begin to intertwine and merge.
