= Cavell Nurses' Trust =

UK charitable organisation

Cavell
- Formation: 1917
- Headquarters: Redditch
- Region served: United Kingdom
- Website: www.cavell.org.uk

Cavell (formerly Cavell Nurses' Trust until August 2023) is a charitable organisation which supports nurses, midwives and healthcare assistants in the United Kingdom. It was founded in 1917 in the memory of British nurse Edith Cavell.

== Benevolent fund ==
As of 2023, Cavell's objective is to support UK nurses, midwives and healthcare assistants, working and retired, when they're suffering personal or financial hardship often due to illness, disability, older age, domestic abuse and the ongoing cost of living crisis. In 2022, the Cavell Support team saw a 200% rise in those seeking help from the charity compared to the previous year. And in the first 6 months of 2023, there has been an additional 35% increase in nurses, midwives and healthcare assistants seeking help, compared to the same time last year, so demand remains very high.

== History ==
Edith Cavell was executed in 1915 during the First World War by a German firing squad. A year after her death The Lancet published a letter from her sister, who wrote to say Edith "had long cherished the idea of establishing homes of rest for nurses." An appeal was set up, with the Edith Cavell Homes of Rest for Nurses registered as a war charity. By July 1918 Queen Alexandra had become the patron. The Daily Telegraph and the Daily Mirror launched a national appeal for funds in her memory. The appeal by the newspapers raised £12,500. By 1919, an Edith Cavell Home of Rest in Richmond was up and running. In 1921, administration of the Edith Cavell Homes of Rest for Nurses transferred to Nation's Fund for Nurses.

In October 2012 NurseAid rebranded to Cavell Nurses' Trust, changing their name and new logo to place more emphasis on their link with Edith Cavell. The trust is registered with the Charity Commission for England and Wales as the Edith Cavell Fund For Nurses.

In August 2023, Cavell Nurses' Trust rebranded to Cavell.
