= Stella Rimington =

British director of MI5 (1935–2025)

Dame Stella Rimington DCB
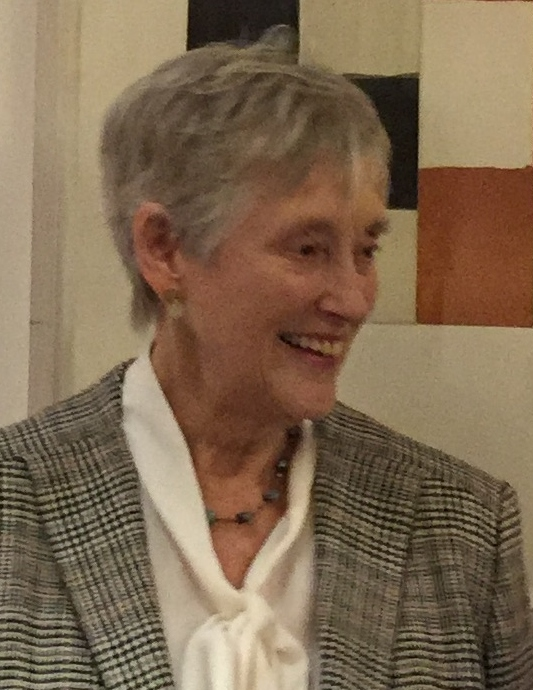
- Rimington in 2016
- Born: Stella Whitehouse; 13 May 1935; South London, England
- Died: 3 August 2025 (aged 90)
- Education: University of Edinburgh; University of Liverpool
- Occupations: Intelligence officer; author
- Spouse: John Rimington (m. 1963; sep. 1984)
- Children: 2
- Espionage activity
- Allegiance: United Kingdom
- Service branch: MI5
- Service years: 1967–1996
- Rank: Director General of MI5

Dame Stella Rimington (née Whitehouse; 13 May 1935 – 3 August 2025) was a British author and Director General of MI5, a position she held from 1992 to 1996. She was the first female Director General of MI5, and the first Director General whose name was publicised on appointment. In 1993, Rimington became the first Director General of MI5 to pose openly for photos at the launch of a brochure outlining the organisation's activities.

== Early life ==
Stella Whitehouse was born on 13 May 1935 in South London, England. Her family moved out of South Norwood in 1939, because of the dangers of living in London during World War II, first to Essex, where her father was hired as chief draughtsman at a steelworks, and later to Barrow-in-Furness, Cumbria. She described living through the Barrow Blitz as a small child and becoming claustrophobic into adulthood, needing an exit route from any situation.

She was educated at Croslands Convent School after spending some time in Wallasey. When her father found another job in Ilkeston, Derbyshire, the family moved to the Midlands, where she attended Nottingham High School for Girls. Whitehouse spent her last summer of secondary school working as an au pair in Paris, before enrolling at the University of Edinburgh in 1954 to study English. After completing her degree in 1958, she studied archive administration at the University of Liverpool, before beginning work as an archivist at the County Record Office in Worcester in 1959. In 1963, she married Rimington and moved to London, where she successfully applied for a position at the India Office Library.

In 1965, her husband was offered an overseas posting as First Secretary (Economic) for the British High Commission in New Delhi, India, and the couple sailed to India in September.

== India and MI5 ==
In 1967, after two years in India, Rimington was asked to assist one of the First Secretaries at the High Commission with his office work. She agreed, and when she began, discovered that he was the representative in India of the British Security Service (MI5). Gaining her security clearance, Rimington worked in the MI5 office for nearly two years, until she and her husband returned to London in 1969, where she decided to apply for a permanent position at MI5.

Between 1969 and 1990, Rimington worked in all three branches of the Security Service: counter-espionage, counter-subversion, and counter-terrorism. Following the 1979 Department of Health and Social Security computer operators strike, Rimington became an assistant director of the revived Inter-departmental Group on Subversion in Public Life to identify and limit the actions of subversives in the civil service.

In 1989, she gave evidence in court against the Czechoslovak spy Václav Jelínek (prosecuted under his alias of "Erwin van Haarlem"), using the alias "Miss J". In 1990, she was promoted to one of the Service's two Deputy Director General positions, where she oversaw MI5's move to Thames House. In December 1991, she made a visit to Moscow to make the first friendly contact between the British intelligence services and their old enemies the KGB. On her return from Russia she was told she had been promoted to Director General.

== Director General ==
Her appointment was publicly announced by the Home Secretary on 16 December 1991. In her first months as Director General, Rimington was subject to a determined campaign by the British press to find more details about her. The New Statesman and The Independent obtained and published covert photographs of her, despite which Rimington oversaw a public relations campaign to improve the openness of the Service and increase public transparency. On 16 July 1993, MI5 (with the reluctant approval of the British Government) published a 36-page booklet titled The Security Service, which revealed publicly, for the first time, details of MI5's activities, operations and duties, as well as the identity and even photographs of Rimington as Director General.

Rimington retired from MI5 in 1996. She was made a Dame Commander of the Order of the Bath (DCB) in the 1996 New Year Honours.

Her role in the service was considered a model for Dame Judi Dench's portrayal of M in the James Bond series starting in GoldenEye.

== Post-MI5 ==
Rimington's work after leaving MI5 had been as a non-executive director for companies such as Marks & Spencer and BG Group.

Rimington published her memoirs, entitled Open Secret, in 2001. In 2004, her first novel, At Risk, about a female intelligence officer, Liz Carlyle, was published. A series of further novels followed.

In 2004, she continued her interest in archives, fostered by her early career, through involvement with the Archives Task Force, where she visited a number of archives through the country and contributed to the report for the future strategy of archives in the UK.

In 2005, she spoke out against national ID cards. She also described the US response to the 9/11 attacks as a "huge overreaction". In 2009, Rimington expressed concerns that the Brown administration was not "recognis[ing] that there are risks, rather than frightening people in order to be able to pass laws which restrict civil liberties, precisely one of the objects of terrorism: that we live in fear and under a police state." Rimington claimed that MI5 files collected by her predecessors had been destroyed, but without clarifying whether this took place during her appointment as Director General, or as part of her later involvement with the Archives Task Force.

In 2009, Rimington received an Honorary Degree of Doctor of Social Science from Nottingham Trent University in recognition of her support for openness about the work of the secret service.

She was chair of the judges for the 2011 Man Booker Prize. She and her fellow judges were widely criticised for focusing on "readability" rather than literary quality. Rimington responded during her speech at the Booker ceremony with a "diatribe" in which she compared British literary critics to the KGB.

== Personal life and death ==
In 1963, she married John Rimington, whom she knew from school. They had two daughters and separated in 1984. They did not divorce, as it "seemed a faff", and later reconciled, living together during the COVID lockdown of 2021. She commented: "It's a good recipe for marriage, I'd say: split up, live separately, and return to it later".

Rimington died on 3 August 2025, aged 90.

== Bibliography ==
=== At Risk ===
Rimington's first novel, At Risk, brings her knowledge of spy operations to the thriller genre. Her heroine is an MI5 intelligence officer, 34-year-old Liz Carlyle, whose mission is to hunt down a terrorist cell.

At Risk has received positive reviews with The Telegraph saying, "At Risk is breezily told, seldom pompous, and the plot, though every bit as hokey as you'd expect, winds its threads together very entertainingly." The acknowledgements section indicates that it was written with the help of Luke Jennings: "Huge thanks are also due to Luke Jennings whose help with the research and the writing made it all happen." Some attributed the improvement in writing quality from her earlier autobiography to Jennings' involvement.

=== Autobiography ===
- Rimington, Stella (2001). Open Secret: The Autobiography of the Former Director-General of MI5. London: Hutchinson. ISBN 0-09-179360-2.

=== Liz Carlyle novels ===
- Rimington, Stella (2004). At Risk. London: Hutchinson. ISBN 0-09-179996-1.
- Rimington, Stella (2006). Secret Asset. London: Hutchinson. ISBN 0-09-180024-2.
- Rimington, Stella (2007). Illegal Action. London: Hutchinson. ISBN 978-0-09-179722-5.
- Rimington, Stella (2008). Dead Line. London: Quercus Publishing. ISBN 978-1-84724-310-2.
- Rimington, Stella (2009). Present Danger. London: Quercus Publishing. ISBN 978-1-84724-994-4.
- Rimington, Stella (2011). Rip Tide. London: Bloomsbury Publishing. ISBN 978-1-4088-1112-2.
- Rimington, Stella (2012). The Geneva Trap. London: Bloomsbury Publishing. ISBN 978-1-4088-3218-9.
- Rimington, Stella (2014). Close Call. London: Bloomsbury Publishing. ISBN 978-1-4088-4104-4.
- Rimington, Stella (2016). Breaking Cover. London: Bloomsbury Publishing. ISBN 978-1-63286-526-7.
- Rimington, Stella (2018). The Moscow Sleepers. London: Bloomsbury Publishing. ISBN 978-1-4088-5975-9.

=== Manon Tyler novels ===
- Rimington, Stella (2022). The Devil's Bargain. London: Bloomsbury Publishing. ISBN 978-1-5266-5149-5.
- Rimington, Stella (2025). The Hidden Hand. London: Bloomsbury Publishing. ISBN 978-1-5266-5273-7.

Government offices
| Preceded by Sir Patrick Walker | Director General of MI5; 1992–1996 | Succeeded by Stephen Lander |
