= John Rimington (civil servant) =

British civil servant

John David Rimington, CB (born 1935) is a retired British civil servant.

Born in 1935, Rimington attended Jesus College, Cambridge, before completing National Service in the Army. He entered HM Civil Service in 1959 as an official in the Board of Trade. From 1965 to 1969, he was a first secretary for economic matters in the British Embassy in New Delhi. After a year at the Department of Trade and Industry, he entered the Department of Employment in 1970. After another period abroad from 1974 (as a counsellor in the UK's permanent representation to the European Economic Community), he was transferred to the Manpower Services Commission in 1977.

In 1981, Rimington became director of the safety policy division of the Health and Safety Executive (HSE), and he was appointed Director-General of the HSE in 1984, serving until he retired in 1995. He was also a deputy secretary in the Department of Employment from 1984 and between 1992 and 1995 was Second Permanent Secretary in the department. For his service, Rimington was appointed a Companion of the Order of the Bath (CB) in 1987. In retirement, he has held a visiting professorship at the University of Strathclyde and delivered the Royal Society for the Prevention of Accidents' Allan St John Holt Lecture in 2008.

== Personal life ==
In 1963 he married Stella Whitehouse, whom he knew from school. In 1984 they separated, with Stella retaining custody of their two daughters. They did not divorce because it "seemed a faff", and in later life reconciled, living together during the COVID lockdown of 2021. Stella Rimington commented "It's a good recipe for marriage, I'd say: split up, live separately, and return to it later".

Government offices
Preceded by John Locke	Director-General of the Health and Safety Executive; 1984–1995	Succeeded by Jennifer Bacon
Preceded by none	Second Permanent Secretary of the Department of Employment; 1992–1995	Succeeded by none
