= Princess Marie of Croÿ =

Member of the Belgian aristocracy and Belgian Resistance

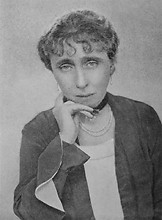
- Marie of Croÿ circa 1930
- Born: 26 November 1875; London, England
- Died: 20 June 1968 (aged 92); Saint-Benin-d'Azy, Nièvre, France
- Honours: Order of Leopold (Belgium); Légion d'honneur (France)

Princess Marie Élisabeth Louise of Croÿ (26 November 1875 – 20 June 1968) was a member of the Belgian aristocracy and a member of the Belgian Resistance during both World Wars.

== Early life ==
Princess Marie was born in London, the daughter of Prince Alfred Emmanuel of Croÿ-Solre (1842-1888) and his wife, Elizabeth Mary Parnell (1855-1912). Her brother, Prince Réginald of Croÿ (1878-1961), was also involved in anti-German activities during the First World War.

== First World War ==
When the First World War broke out in 1914, the princess was visiting a friend, Anne Violet Cavendish-Bentinck (1864-1932), at the home of her mother, Mrs Louisa Scott; she immediately set out for France. She worked as a nurse, at the family home of Chateau de Bellignies, which was in use as a hospital, and assisted Edith Cavell in helping allied servicemen to escape to Britain via the Netherlands. For this she was arrested in 1915 along with Nurse Cavell and a number of others, but escaped the death penalty. At their trial in October, she asked for clemency for her fellow prisoners, claiming that she and her brother were solely responsible. She was condemned to ten years' hard labour, and sent to a prison at Siegburg in Germany. The Kaiser, Wilhelm II, offered to free her, but she declined because she did not want to be given preferential treatment.

In 1917, the princess was admitted to hospital in Bonn, her health seriously affected by prison conditions. She was finally released on 13 November 1918. The Canadian journalist Elizabeth Montizambert, who had been in the occupied territory during the war, became a close friend of Marie and her brother.

== Later life ==
During the Second World War, the princess was again involved in Resistance activities. Henri Giraud, who had been assisted by Nurse Cavell's team when he was a junior officer, once again received Princess Marie's help when he escaped from Königstein Castle in 1942. She was arrested at Lille.

In recognition of her war service, she was awarded the honours of Chevalier of the Order of Leopold and of the Légion d'honneur.

She wrote a memoir of her war experiences, titled War Memories, which was published by Macmillan in 1932. She did not marry, and died at Saint-Benin-d'Azy, aged 92.
