= Bellignies =

- Commune
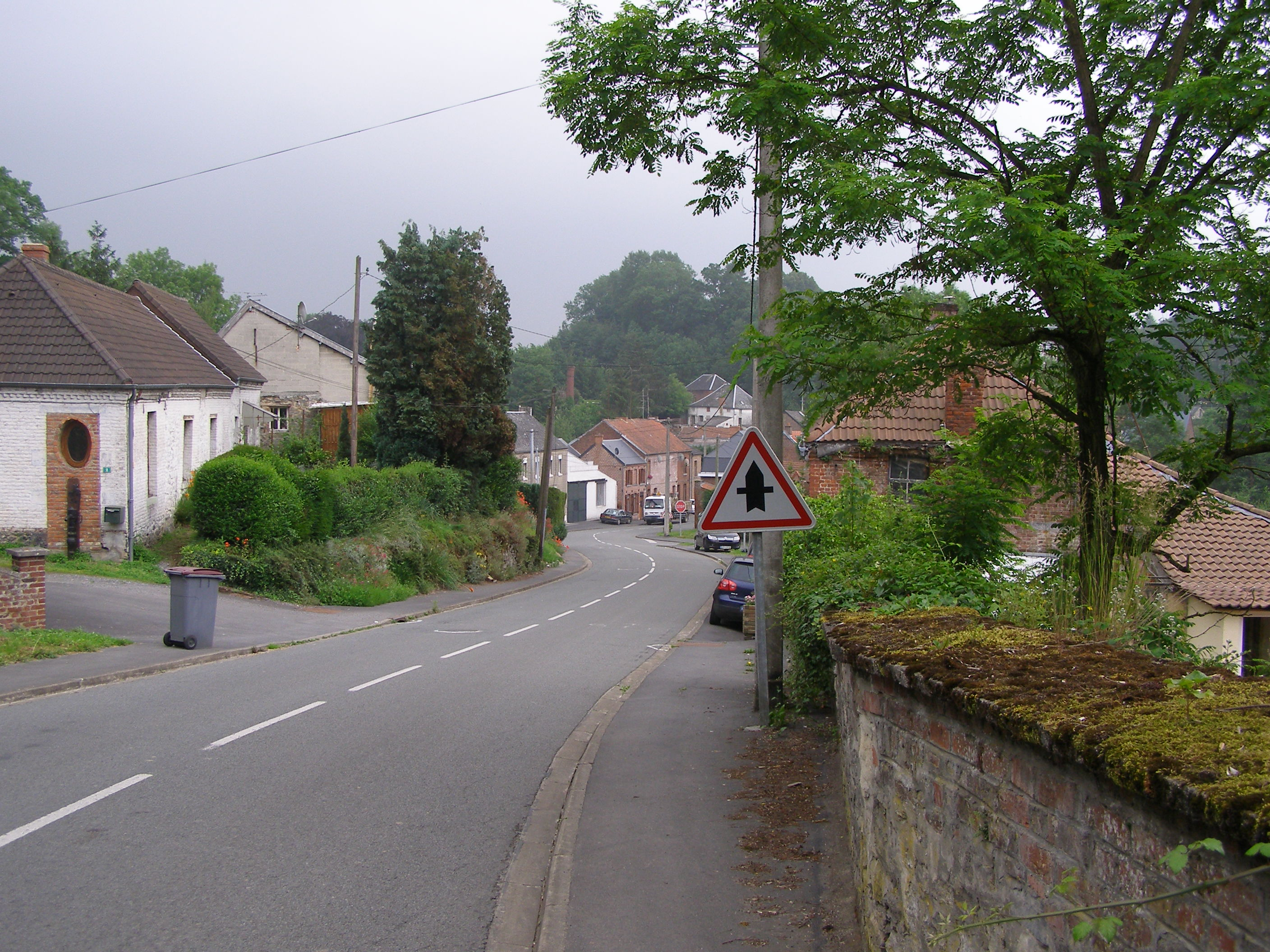
- A view within Bellignies

- Coat of arms
- Location of Bellignies
- Location within France Location within Hauts-de-France
- Coordinates: 50°19′46″N 3°46′12″E
- Country: France
- Region: Hauts-de-France
- Department: Nord
- Arrondissement: Avesnes-sur-Helpe
- Canton: Aulnoye-Aymeries
- Intercommunality: Pays de Mormal

Government
  - Mayor (2020–2026): Danièle Druesnes
- Area^{1}: 5.18 km^{2} (2.00 sq mi)
- Elevation: 102 m (335 ft)
- Highest elevation: 136 m (446 ft)
- Lowest elevation: 72 m (236 ft)
- Population (2023): 810
  - Density: 160/km^{2} (400/sq mi)
- Time zone: UTC+01:00 (CET)
  - Summer (DST): UTC+02:00 (CEST)
- INSEE/Postal code: 59065 /59570
- ^{1} French Land Register data, which excludes lakes, ponds, glaciers > 1 km^{2} (0.386 sq mi or 247 acres) and river estuaries.

Bellignies (French pronunciation: [beliɲi]) is a commune in the Nord department in northern France.

== Population ==
Historical population
Year	Pop.	±% p.a.
1968	880	—
1975	888	+0.13%
1982	912	+0.38%
1990	901	−0.15%
1999	836	−0.83%
2007	920	+1.20%
2012	874	−1.02%
2017	827	−1.10%
2023	810	−0.35%
Source: INSEE

== Heraldry ==
Arms of Bellignies	The arms of Bellignies are blazoned : Quarterly 1&4: Or, 5 bendlets, and on a canton gules a mullet Or; 2&3 Chequy Or and gules (of 4 traits).

== See also ==
- Communes of the Nord department
