= Warrior-class cruiser =

Royal Navy's Warrior-class of four armoured cruisers

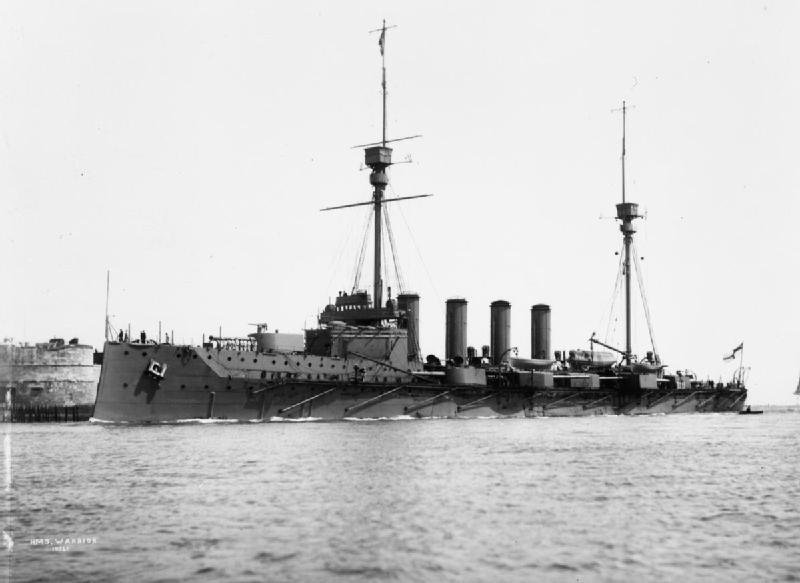
- HMS Warrior

Class overview
- Name: Warrior
- Operators: Royal Navy
- Preceded by: Duke of Edinburgh class
- Succeeded by: Minotaur class
- Built: 1903–1907
- In service: 1907–1919
- Completed: 4
- Lost: 2
- Scrapped: 2

General characteristics
- Type: Armoured cruiser
- Displacement: 12,590 long tons (12,790 t)
- Length: 480 ft (146.3 m) (p/p); 505.5 ft (154.1 m) (o/a)
- Beam: 73.5 ft (22.4 m)
- Draught: 27.5 ft (8.4 m)
- Installed power: 26 boilers; 23,000 ihp (17,000 kW)
- Propulsion: 2 shafts; 2 triple-expansion steam engines
- Speed: 23 knots (43 km/h; 26 mph)
- Range: 8,130 nmi (15,060 km; 9,360 mi) at 10 knots (19 km/h; 12 mph)
- Complement: 789
- Armament: 6 × single BL 9.2 in (234 mm) guns; 4 × single 7.5 in (191 mm) guns; 24 × single 3 pdr (47 mm (1.9 in)) guns; 3 × 18 in (450 mm) torpedo tubes
- Armour: Waterline belt: 3–6 in (76–152 mm); Deck: .75–1.5 in (19–38 mm); Barbettes: 3–6 in (76–152 mm); Gun turrets: 4.5–7.5 in (114–191 mm); Conning tower: 10 in (254 mm); Bulkheads: 2–6 in (51–152 mm)

The Warrior class consisted of four armoured cruisers built for the Royal Navy in the first decade of the 20th century. After commissioning, all four sister ships were assigned to the Channel and Home Fleets until 1913 when Warrior was transferred to the Mediterranean Fleet. After the start of World War I in August 1914, Warrior participated in the pursuit of the German battlecruiser SMS Goeben and light cruiser SMS Breslau and her three sisters were assigned to the 2nd Cruiser Squadron of the Grand Fleet. Warrior joined the 1st Cruiser Squadron of the Grand Fleet in late 1914. Neither squadron participated in any of the naval battles in the North Sea in 1915. Natal was destroyed by a magazine explosion in late 1915 and only two of the ships participated in the Battle of Jutland in 1916. Cochrane was not engaged during the battle, but Warrior was heavily damaged and sank the following morning.

Achilles was assigned to blockade duty after the battle and sank a German commerce raider in early 1917. Both of the surviving sisters became convoy escorts in 1917 before returning home in 1918. Cochrane supported the Allied intervention in the Russian Civil War in mid-1918. She ran aground in the River Mersey in late 1918 and broke in two. Achilles became a training ship in late 1918 and was sold for scrap in 1921.

== Design and description ==
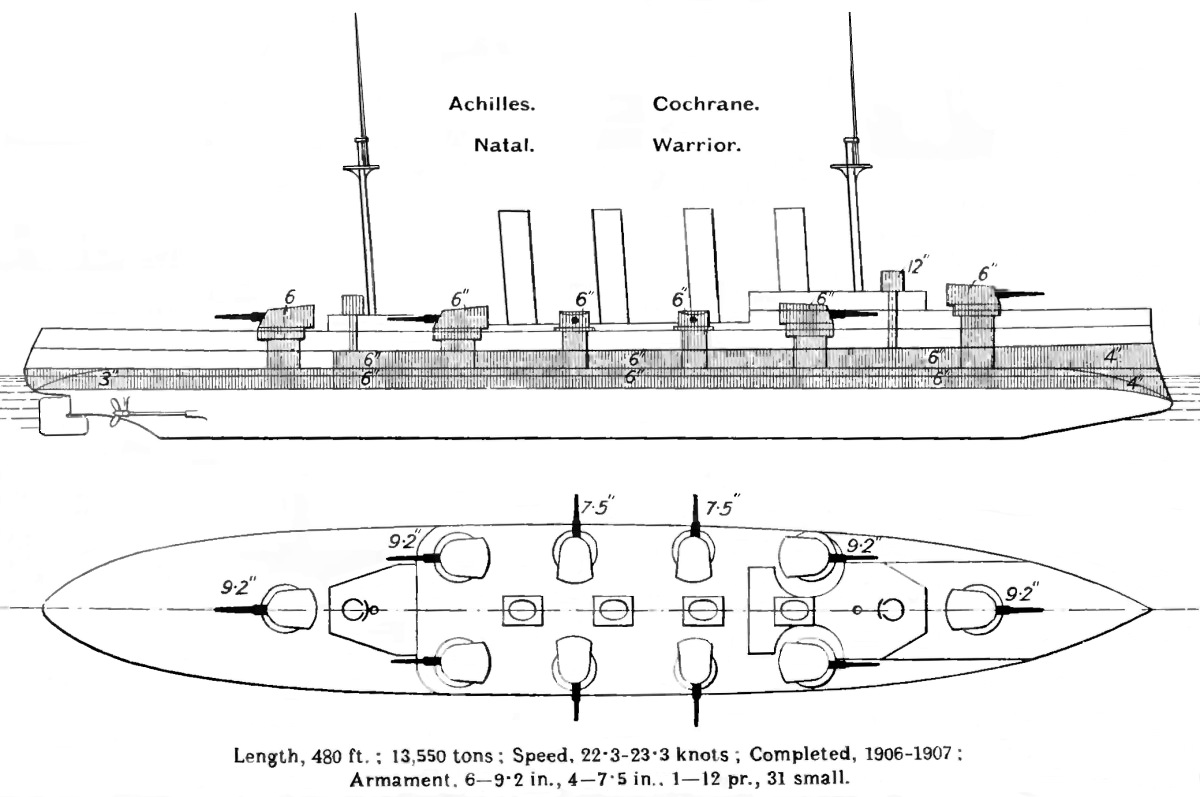
Right elevation and plan view of the Warrior class from the 1912 Brassey's Naval Annual

The four armoured cruisers of the 1903–1904 Naval Programme were originally intended to be repeats of the preceding Duke of Edinburgh class, but complaints from the fleet that the low placement of the secondary armament of earlier ships of this type meant that the guns could not be fought in anything other than a dead calm sea caused the issue to be reviewed by the Board of Admiralty in late 1903 and early 1904. Based on the Duke of Edinburghs, the Warriors were expected to be lighter, which allowed weight to be used for changing the secondary armament. Officers from the fleet suggested changing the armament to four 7.5-inch (191 mm) guns in single-gun turrets raised to the upper deck. As the ships had only just begun construction, the change would cost a total of £250,000 for all four ships and the Admiralty approved the change on 30 March 1904.

The Warrior-class ships were designed to displace 13,550 long tons (13,770 t), but they proved to be lighter as built, even after the change in armament, displacing 13,200–13,350 long tons (13,410–13,560 t) at normal load and 14,500 long tons (14,700 t) (fully loaded). The ships had an overall length of 505 feet 6 inches (154.1 m) and a length between perpendiculars of 480 ft (146.3 m). They had a beam of 73 feet 6 inches (22.4 m) and a deep draught of 26 feet 6 inches (8.1 m) forward and 27 feet 6 inches (8.4 m) aft.

The ships' complement was 770 officers and enlisted men. They were much steadier gun platforms than their predecessors, with a metacentric height of 2.75 feet (0.8 m), so much so that Achilles and Natal were the best-shooting ships in the fleet in 1907 and 1909 respectively. Very good sea boats, according to naval historian Oscar Parkes, "they gained the reputation of being the best cruisers we (the British) ever built."

The cruisers were powered by two 4-cylinder triple-expansion steam engines, each driving one shaft, which produced a total of 23,500 indicated horsepower (17,520 kW) and gave a maximum speed of 23 knots (43 km/h; 26 mph). The engines were powered by steam from 19 Yarrow boilers and six cylindrical boilers that had a working pressure of 225 psi (1,551 kPa; 16 kgf/cm^{2}). The ships carried a maximum of 2,050 long tons (2,080 t) of coal and an additional 600 long tons (610 t) of fuel oil that was sprayed on the coal to increase its burn rate. At full capacity, they could steam for 7,960 nautical miles (14,740 km; 9,160 mi) at a speed of 10 knots (19 km/h; 12 mph).

=== Armament ===
The Warriors' main armament consisted of six 45-calibre BL 9.2-inch Mk X guns in single-gun turrets. The guns were distributed in two centreline turrets, one each fore and one aft of the superstructure, and four wing turrets disposed in the corners about the funnels. The centreline turrets could traverse a total of 285° while the wing turrets were limited to 120° on the broadside due to muzzle blast. The gun had an elevation range of −5° to +15°. The 9.2-inch (234 mm) shell weighed 380 pounds (172.4 kg) and was fired at a maximum muzzle velocity of 2,778 ft/s (847 m/s). This gave it a range of 15,500 yards (14,200 m) at maximum elevation. The gun's rate of fire was about three rounds per minute and the ships carried 100 rounds for each gun.

Their secondary armament of four 50-calibre BL 7.5-inch Mk II guns was arranged in four turrets amidships. The guns could only traverse about 110° on the broadside. They had an elevation range of −7.5° to +15° that gave them a range of 14,238 yards (13,019 m) at an elevation with their 200-pound (90.7 kg) shell. The guns had a rate of fire of about four rounds per minute and each gun was provided with 100 rounds.

Twenty-four Vickers quick-firing (QF) 3-pounder guns were fitted for defence against torpedo boats, six on turret roofs and eighteen in the superstructure, all on pivot mounts. These guns were too small to be useful against the torpedo boats before they got within torpedo range. They fired a 47-millimetre (1.9 in) shell that weighed 3.3 pounds (1.5 kg) and was fired at a maximum muzzle velocity of 2,587 ft/s (789 m/s). This gave it a range of 7,550 yards (6,900 m) at an elevation of +20°. 250 rounds were carried for each gun.

The ships also mounted three submerged 18-inch torpedo tubes. (Note: While most sources show the ships with three torpedo tubes, the ship plans for the Duke of Edinburgh class included in McBride do not show a stern torpedo room and Friedman only lists two torpedo tubes.) They carried a total of eighteen torpedoes in addition to the six 14-inch (356 mm) torpedoes that could be used by the two 45-foot (13.7 m) steam pinnaces.

=== Armour ===
The Warrior-class ships had a 6-inch (152 mm) waterline armour belt of Krupp cemented armour that covered 260 feet (79.2 m) of the hull amidships. It covered the side of the ship up to the upper deck, a height of 14 feet 6 inches (4.42 m) above the waterline and reached 4 feet 10 inches (1.47 m) below it. Between the central citadel and the bow, the belt armour was 4 inches (102 mm) thick and it extended to the stern with a thickness of 3 inches (76 mm). Transverse bulkheads six inches thick protected the citadel from raking fire.

The faces of the main gun turrets were 7.5 inches thick with 5.5-inch (140 mm) sides and a 2-inch (51 mm) roof. The secondary gun turrets were a newer design and had armour 6–8-inch (152–203 mm) thick and the same roof thickness as the other turrets. The barbettes were protected by six inches of armour as were the ammunition hoists, although the armour for those thinned to three inches between the armour belt. The thickness of the lower deck was only .75 inches (19 mm) except for a patch of 1.5-inch (38 mm) armour over the steering gear and another 2 inches (51 mm) thick over the engine cylinders. The sides of the conning tower were 10 inches (254 mm) thick.

=== Modifications ===
Only the modifications for Cochrane are known in detail, but it is likely that her sisters received the same modifications at some point. The funnels proved to be too short in service and they were raised around 1912 to keep the superstructure free of smoke in a following wind. A single Hotchkiss QF 6-pounder anti-aircraft gun on a high-angle mounting was mounted on the quarterdeck in 1915. It had a maximum depression of 8° and a maximum elevation of 60°. The gun fired a 6-pound (2.7 kg) shell at a muzzle velocity of 1,765 ft/s (538 m/s) at a rate of fire of 20 rounds per minute. They had a maximum ceiling of 10,000 ft (3,000 m), but an effective range of only 1,200 yards (1,100 m). It was replaced by a QF 3 inch 20 cwt (Note: "Cwt" is the abbreviation for hundredweight, 20 cwt referring to the weight of the gun.) guns on a high-angle mount in 1916. This gun had a maximum depression of 10° and a maximum elevation of 90°. It fired a 12.5-pound (5.7 kg) shell at a muzzle velocity of 2,500 ft/s (760 m/s) at a rate of 12–14 rounds per minute. It had a maximum effective ceiling of 23,500 ft (7,200 m). A pair of Vickers QF three-pounders on high-angle mountings were probably installed amidships during 1915–16. They could elevate to +80° and depress to -5°. This gun had a rate of fire of 25 rounds per minute and a maximum ceiling of 15,000 ft (4,600 m), but an effective range of only 2,000 yards (1,800 m).

The guns on top of Cochrane's centreline 9.2-inch turrets were removed in 1915–16. The aftermost 3-pounder guns on the superstructure were removed during 1917 as well as the guns on top of the forward 9.2-inch wing turrets. This reduced her total to twenty 3-pounder guns, excluding the AA guns. Cochrane's foremast was converted to a tripod mast to support the weight of a fire-control director in 1917, but the director was not actually fitted until August 1918.

== Ships ==
Construction data
Ship	Builder	Laid down	Launched	Completed	Cost (including armament)
Warrior	HM Dockyard, Pembroke	5 Nov 1903	25 Nov 1905	12 Dec 1906	£1,186,395
Cochrane	Fairfield Shipping and Engineering, Govan	24 Mar 1904	20 May 1905	18 Feb 1907	£1,193,121
Achilles	Armstrong Whitworth, Elswick	22 Feb 1904	17 Jun 1905	22 Apr 1907	£1,191,103
Natal	Vickers, Barrow-in-Furness	6 Jan 1904	30 Sep 1905	5 Mar 1907	£1,218,244

== Service ==
After completion, the four sisters were assigned to the cruiser squadrons of the Channel and Home Fleets. Natal and Cochrane escorted the royal yacht in 1911–12 for the newly crowned King George V's trip to India to attend the Delhi Durbar and Natal carried the body of the U.S. Ambassador to Great Britain, Whitelaw Reid, back to New York City in December 1912. Warrior was transferred to the 1st Cruiser Squadron of the Mediterranean Fleet in 1913.

At the beginning of World War I, Natal, Achilles and Cochrane were assigned to the 2nd Cruiser Squadron of the Grand Fleet and Warrior was in the Mediterranean. The latter ship was involved in the pursuit of the Goeben and Breslau, but the squadron commander, Rear Admiral Ernest Troubridge, declined to engage the German ships. Warrior remained in the Mediterranean until she was assigned the Grand Fleet in December 1914 and rejoined the 1st Cruiser Squadron. The other three ships remained with the 2nd Cruiser Squadron for most of their careers and did not participate in any of the early naval battles of the war. Natal was sunk by a magazine explosion near Cromarty on 30 December 1915, killing an estimated 390–421 persons on board. Most of her wreck was slowly salvaged over the decades until the remnants were demolished in the 1970s so they were no longer a hazard to navigation.

Achilles was refitting in May 1916 and did not participate in the Battle of Jutland, although both of her surviving sisters did. Warrior was heavily damaged by German capital ships during the battle, losing 71 crewmen killed and 36 wounded. She took on a lot of water and foundered the following morning after her crew was evacuated. The 2nd Cruiser Squadron was not engaged during the battle and did not fire a shot. Achilles was assigned blockade duties in the North Sea after the battle and sank the German raider Leopard in early 1917. Both of the surviving ships were briefly transferred to the North America and West Indies Station in late 1917 for convoy escort duties before returning home in early 1918. Achilles began a lengthy refit in February 1918 while Cochrane was based in Murmansk in mid-1918 during the Allied intervention in the Russian Civil War. She became stranded in the Mersey on 14 November 1918 and broke in two. The wreck was broken up in place by June 1919. Achilles, the last surviving sister, became a training ship in late 1918 and was sold for scrap in May 1921.

== Bibliography ==
- Campbell, John (1998). Jutland: An Analysis of the Fighting. London: Conway Maritime Press. ISBN 1-55821-759-2.
- Chesneau, Roger & Kolesnik, Eugene M., eds. (1979). Conway's All the World's Fighting Ships 1860–1905. Greenwich: Conway Maritime Press. ISBN 0-8317-0302-4.
- Corbett, Julian (March 1997). Naval Operations to the Battle of the Falklands. History of the Great War: Based on Official Documents. Vol. I (2nd, reprint of the 1938 ed.). London and Nashville, Tennessee: Imperial War Museum and Battery Press. ISBN 0-89839-256-X.
- Friedman, Norman (2012). British Cruisers of the Victorian Era. Barnsley, South Yorkshire, UK: Seaforth. ISBN 978-1-59114-068-9.
- Friedman, Norman (2011). Naval Weapons of World War One. Barnsley, South Yorkshire, UK: Seaforth. ISBN 978-1-84832-100-7.
- McBride, Keith (1990). "The Dukes and the Warriors". Warship International. XXVII (4). International Naval Research Organization: 362–93. ISSN 0043-0374.
- Newbolt, Henry (1996). Naval Operations. History of the Great War Based on Official Documents. Vol. IV (reprint of the 1928 ed.). Nashville, Tennessee: Battery Press. ISBN 0-89839-253-5.
- Newbolt, Henry (1997). Naval Operations. History of the Great War: Based on Official Documents. Vol. V (reprint of the 1931 ed.). London and Nashville, Tennessee: Imperial War Museum and Battery Press. ISBN 1-870423-72-0.
- Parkes, Oscar (1990). British Battleships (reprint of the 1957 ed.). Annapolis, Maryland: Naval Institute Press. ISBN 1-55750-075-4.
- Preston, Antony (1985). "Great Britain and Empire Forces". In Gardiner, Robert & Gray, Randal (eds.). Conway's All the World's Fighting Ships 1906–1921. Annapolis, Maryland: Naval Institute Press. pp. 1–104. ISBN 0-85177-245-5.
- Roberts, John (October 1989). "HMS Cochrane". Warship. Warship. Vol. III. London: Conway Maritime Press. pp. 34–36. ISBN 0-85177-204-8.
- Silverstone, Paul H. (1984). Directory of the World's Capital Ships. New York: Hippocrene Books. ISBN 0-88254-979-0.
