= HMS Cochrane (1905) =

Warrior-class armoured cruiser for the Royal Navy

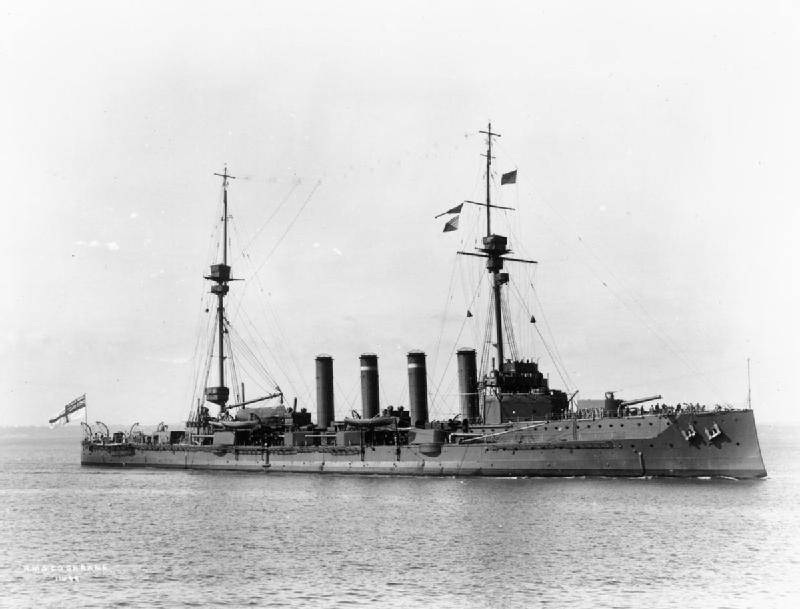

History

United Kingdom
- Name: HMS Cochrane
- Builder: Fairfield Shipbuilding and Engineering, Govan
- Laid down: 24 March 1904
- Launched: 28 May 1905
- Completed: 18 February 1907
- Fate: Stranded on the River Mersey 14 November 1918, wreck broken up

General characteristics
- Class & type: Warrior-class armoured cruiser
- Displacement: 13,550 long tons (13,770 t) (normal); 14,500 long tons (14,700 t) (deep load)
- Length: 505 ft 4 in (154.0 m)
- Beam: 73 ft 6 in (22.4 m)
- Draught: 27 ft 6 in (8.4 m) (maximum)
- Installed power: 23,650 ihp (17,640 kW); 19 Yarrow water-tube boilers and 6 cylindrical boilers
- Propulsion: 2 shafts; 4-cylinder triple-expansion steam engines
- Speed: 23 knots (43 km/h; 26 mph)
- Complement: 712
- Armament: 6 × 1 - BL 9.2-inch (234 mm) Mk X guns; 4 × 1 - BL 7.5-inch (191 mm) Mk II or Mk V guns; 26 × 1 - QF 3-pounder (47 mm) guns; 3 × 1 - submerged 18-inch (450 mm) torpedo tubes
- Armour: Belt: 3–6 in (76–152 mm); Decks: 0.75–1.5 in (19–38 mm); Barbettes: 3–6 in (76–152 mm); Turrets: 4.5–7.5 in (110–190 mm); Conning tower: 10 in (250 mm); Bulkheads: 2–6 in (51–152 mm)=

HMS Cochrane was a Warrior-class armoured cruiser built for the Royal Navy in the first decade of the 20th century. She served in the 2nd Cruiser Squadron during the First World War under Rear-Admiral Herbert Heath, and commanded by Capt. Bill Goodenough, taking part in the Battle of Jutland in 1916. She was based in Murmansk in mid-1918 during the Allied intervention in the Russian Civil War. She became stranded in the River Mersey on 14 November 1918 and broke in two. The wreck was broken up in place by June 1919.

== Description ==
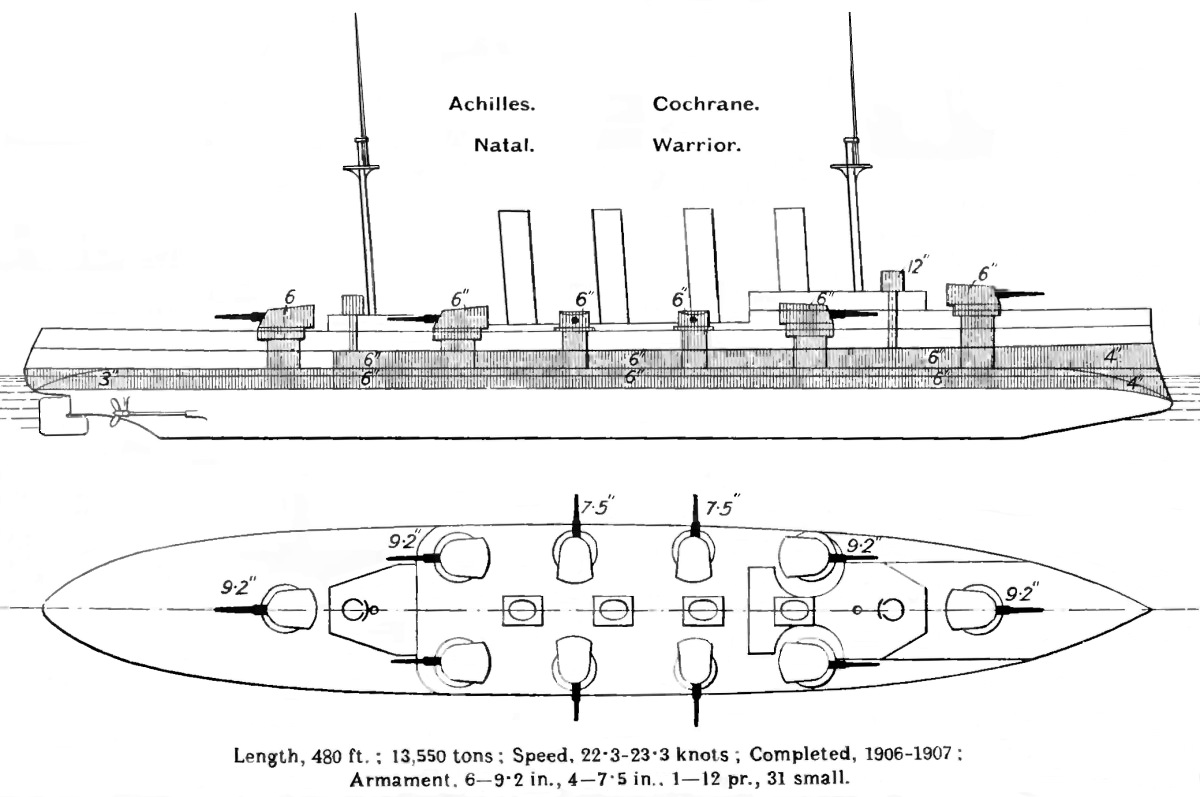
Right elevation and plan view from Brassey's Naval Annual; the shaded areas show her armouring

Christened by Winifred Cochrane, Countess of Dundonald, Cochrane displaced 13,550 long tons (13,770 t) as built and 14,500 long tons (14,700 t) fully loaded, with a length of 505 feet 4 inches (154.0 m), a beam of 73 feet 6 inches (22.4 m) and a draft of 27 feet 6 inches (8.4 m). She was powered by a pair of four-cylinder triple-expansion steam engines, each driving one propeller shafts, which developed a total of 23,650 indicated horsepower (17,640 kW) and gave a maximum speed of 23.3 knots (43.2 km/h; 26.8 mph). The engines were powered by 19 Yarrow water-tube boilers and six cylindrical boilers. The ship carried enough coal and fuel oil to give her a range of 7,960 nautical miles (14,740 km; 9,160 mi) at a speed of 10 knots (19 km/h; 12 mph).

Her main armament consisted of six BL 9.2-inch (234 mm) Mark X guns in single Mk V turrets distributed in two centreline turrets, one each fore and aft of the superstructure, and four turrets disposed in the corners about the funnels. Her secondary armament of four BL 7.5-inch (191 mm) Mark II or Mark V guns in single Mk II turrets was carried amidships, between the wing 9.2-inch guns. Twenty-six Vickers QF 3 pounders were fitted, ten on turret roofs and eight each on the forward and aft superstructures. The last four ships of the Duke of Edinburgh-class cruisers had a secondary armament of turreted 7.5-inch guns rather than the 6-inch (152 mm) guns in open barbettes of the first two ships; these latter four were sometimes referred to as the Warrior class. Because of the extra topweight of the turrets in comparison to their half-sisters their stability was reduced which made them very good seaboats and steady gun platforms.

=== Wartime modifications ===
A single Hotchkiss QF 6-pounder anti-aircraft gun on a high-angle Mark Ic mounting was mounted on the quarterdeck in 1915. It had a maximum depression of 8° and a maximum elevation of 60°. The gun fired a 6-pound (2.7 kg) shell at a muzzle velocity of 1,765 ft/s (538 m/s) at a rate of fire of 20 rounds per minute. They had a maximum ceiling of 10,000 ft (3,000 m), but an effective range of only 1,200 yards (1,100 m). It was replaced by a QF 3 inch 20 cwt guns on a high-angle Mark II mount in 1916. This gun had a maximum depression of 10° and a maximum elevation of 90°. It fired a 12.5-pound (5.7 kg) shell at a muzzle velocity of 2,500 ft/s (760 m/s) at a rate of 12–14 rounds per minute. It had a maximum effective ceiling of 23,500 ft (7,200 m). A pair of Vickers QF 3 pounder on HA Mark III mountings were probably installed amidships during 1915–16. They could elevate to +80° and depress to -5°. This gun fired a 3.3-pound (1.5 kg) shell at a muzzle velocity of 2,575 ft/s (785 m/s) at a rate of 25 rounds per minute. They had a maximum ceiling of 15,000 ft (4,600 m), but an effective range of only 2,000 yards (1,800 m).

The guns on top of 'A' and 'Y' turrets were removed in 1915–16. The aftermost 3-pounder guns on the superstructure were removed during 1917 as well as the guns on top of the forward 9.2-inch wing turrets. This reduced her total to twenty 3-pounder guns, excluding the AA guns. Some of these guns were landed at Murmansk while she was based there. Seventeen 3-pounders were on board when she was lost in 1919, but it is unclear if that total includes the AA guns. Cochrane's foremast was converted to a tripod mast to support the weight of a fire-control director in 1917, but the director was not actually fitted until August 1918.

== Construction and career ==
Cochrane was laid down on 24 March 1904 and launched on 28 May 1905 at Fairfield Shipbuilding and Engineering, Govan, Scotland. The ship was commissioned with a nucleus crew on 18 February 1907 and cost £1,193,121. She "joined the Nore Division of the Home Fleet on 6 March 1907 and shortly afterwards was brought into full commission for service with the 5th Cruiser Squadron. On 1 April 1909 she recommissioned for service with the 2nd Cruiser Squadron with which she remained until September 1917." She escorted the Royal Yacht Medina in 1911–1912. Cochrane, accompanied by her sister Achilles and three other armoured cruisers were sent to reinforce the defences of the Shetland Islands on 2 August 1914, days before the start of the First World War. She, and her squadron, were assigned to the Grand Fleet for most of the First World War. She took part in the Battle of Jutland on 31 May–1 June 1916, along with the armoured cruisers Minotaur, Shannon, and Hampshire under the command of Rear-Admiral Herbert Heath. However, the ship remained unengaged throughout the battle, and did not fire her 9.2 or 7.5-inch guns at all.

Cochrane was transferred to the North America and West Indies Station, with its headquarters and Royal Naval Dockyard at the Imperial fortress colony of Bermuda, in November 1917, but rejoined the 2nd Cruiser Squadron early in 1918. She was based in Murmansk between March and September 1918 during the Allied intervention in the Russian Civil War. She ferried Soviet troops to Pechenga on 3 May to forestall an attempt by White Finns to seize the town. On 14 November 1918 she was stranded in the Mersey Estuary while under the control of a pilot and later broke in two, becoming a total loss. The wreck had been broken up in situ by June 1919.
