= HMS Natal =

British Warrior-class armoured cruiser

Coordinates: 57°41′N 4°5′W

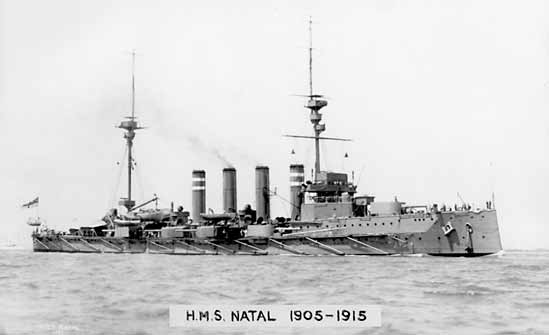
- HMS Natal

History

United Kingdom
- Name: HMS Natal
- Namesake: Colony of Natal
- Builder: Vickers, Sons & Maxim, Barrow-in-Furness
- Laid down: January 1904
- Launched: 30 September 1905
- Christened: by Louisa Cavendish, Duchess of Devonshire
- Completed: 5 March 1907
- Nickname(s): Sea Hearse
- Fate: Vessel exploded at Cromarty Firth, 30 December 1915

General characteristics
- Class & type: Warrior-class armoured cruiser
- Displacement: 13,550 long tons (13,770 t) (normal); 14,500 long tons (14,700 t) (deep load)
- Length: 505 ft 4 in (154.0 m)
- Beam: 73 ft 6 in (22.4 m)
- Draught: 27 ft 6 in (8.4 m) (maximum)
- Installed power: 23,650 ihp (17,640 kW); 19 Yarrow water-tube boilers and 6 cylindrical boilers
- Propulsion: 2 shafts, 4-cylinder triple-expansion steam engines
- Speed: 23 knots (43 km/h; 26 mph)
- Range: 7,960 nmi (14,740 km; 9,160 mi) at 10 knots (19 km/h; 12 mph)
- Complement: 712
- Armament: 6 × 1 - BL 9.2-inch (234 mm) Mk X guns; 4 × 1 - BL 7.5-inch (191 mm) Mk II or Mk V guns; 26 × 1 - Vickers QF 3-pounder (47 mm) guns; 3 × 1 - submerged 18-inch (450 mm) torpedo tubes
- Armour: Belt: 3–6 in (76–152 mm); Decks: 0.75–1.5 in (19–38 mm); Barbettes: 3–6 in (76–152 mm); Turrets: 4.5–7.5 in (110–190 mm); Conning tower: 10 in (250 mm); Bulkheads: 2–6 in (51–152 mm)

HMS Natal was a Warrior-class armoured cruiser built for the Royal Navy in the first decade of the 20th century. She escorted the royal yacht in 1911–1912 for the newly crowned King George V's trip to India to attend the Delhi Durbar. During World War I the ship was assigned to the 2nd Cruiser Squadron of the Grand Fleet, but did not participate in any battles. Natal was sunk by an internal explosion near Cromarty on 30 December 1915 with the loss of at least 390 crewmen and civilians. Most of her wreck was slowly salvaged over the decades until the remnants were demolished in the 1970s so they were no longer a hazard to navigation. The remains of her wreck are designated as a controlled site under the Protection of Military Remains Act 1986 as a war grave.

== Description ==
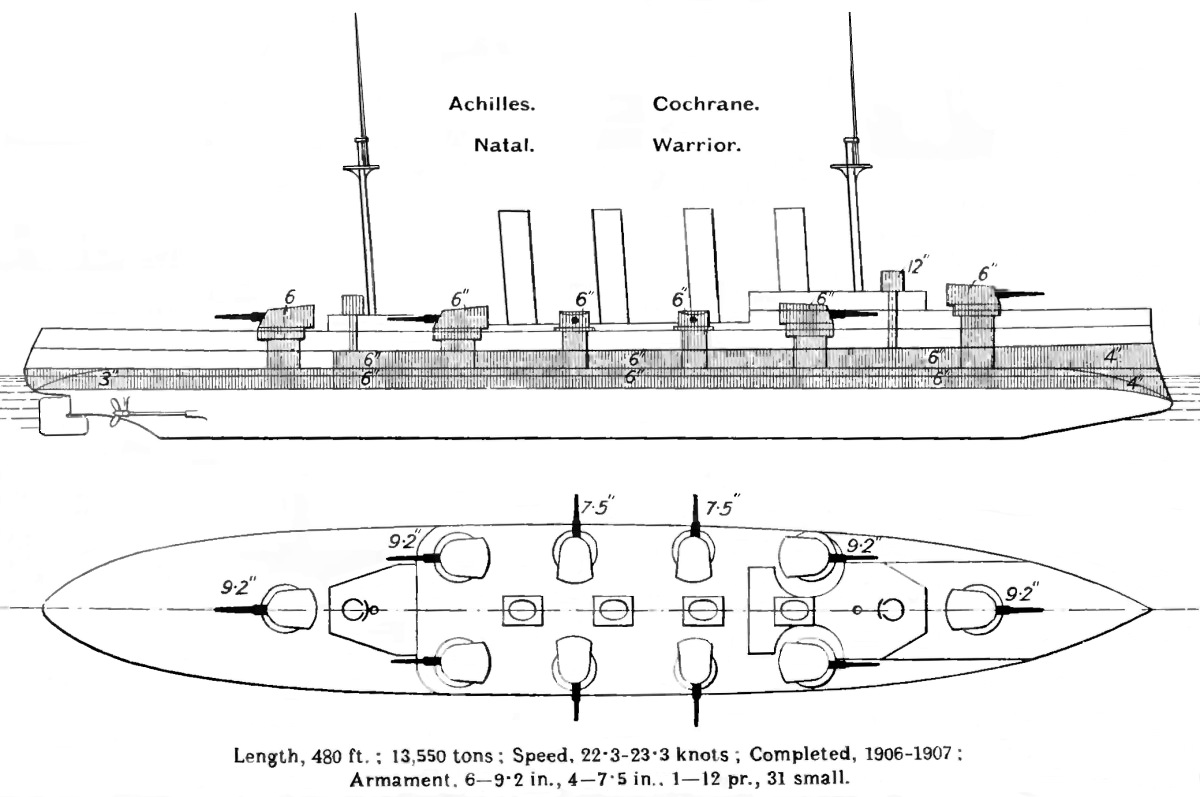
Right elevation and plan view from Brassey's Naval Annual; the shaded areas show her armouring

Natal displaced 13,550 long tons (13,770 t) as built and 14,500 long tons (14,700 t) fully loaded. The ship had an overall length of 505 feet 4 inches (154.0 m), a beam of 73 feet 6 inches (22.4 m) and a draught of 27 feet 6 inches (8.4 m). She was powered by four-cylinder triple-expansion steam engines, driving two shafts, which developed a total of 23,650 indicated horsepower (17,640 kW) and gave a maximum speed of 23.3 knots (43.2 km/h; 26.8 mph). The engines were powered by 19 Yarrow water-tube boilers and six cylindrical boilers. The ship carried a maximum of 2,050 long tons (2,080 t) of coal and an additional 600 long tons (610 t) of fuel oil that was sprayed on the coal to increase its burn rate. At full capacity, she could steam for 7,960 nautical miles (14,740 km; 9,160 mi) at a speed of 10 knots (19 km/h; 12 mph).

=== Armament ===
Her main armament consisted of six BL 9.2-inch (234 mm) Mark X guns in single Mk V turrets distributed in two centerline turrets (one each fore and one aft) and four turrets disposed in the corners about the funnels. Her secondary armament of four BL 7.5-inch (191 mm) Mark II or Mark V guns in single Mk II turrets was carried amidships, between the wing 9.2-inch guns. Twenty-six Vickers QF 3-pounders were fitted, ten on turret roofs and eight each on the forward and aft superstructures. The last four ships of the Duke of Edinburgh-class cruisers had a secondary armament of turreted 7.5-inch guns rather than the 6-inch (152 mm) guns in open barbettes of the first two ships; these latter four were sometimes referred to as the Warrior class. Because of the extra topweight of the turrets in comparison to their half-sisters their stability was reduced which made them very good seaboats and steady gun platforms. The ship also mounted three submerged 18-inch (450 mm) torpedo tubes, one of which was mounted in the stern.

== Construction and career ==
Natal was ordered as part of the 1903–04 naval construction programme as the second of four armoured cruisers. She was laid down on 6 January 1904 at Barrow-in-Furness by Vickers, Sons & Maxim. She was christened on 30 September 1905 by Louisa Cavendish, Duchess of Devonshire and completed on 5 March 1907 at the cost of £1,218,244. Her name was assigned because the funds required to build her came largely or completely from the inhabitants of Colony of Natal. Like her sister ships, she joined the 5th Cruiser Squadron in 1907, and was later transferred to the 2nd Cruiser Squadron in 1909. Captain William Reginald Hall assumed command after the premature death of Captain F. C. A. Ogilvy in December 1909 and remained in command until June 1911. She escorted the ocean liner RMS Medina in 1911–1912 while the latter ship served as the royal yacht for the newly crowned King George V's trip to India to attend the Delhi Durbar. Natal also had the duty of carrying the body of the U.S. Ambassador to Great Britain, Whitelaw Reid, back to New York in December 1912. After completing this mission, her crew gave her the nickname of Sea Hearse.

On 5 June 1913, while under the command of Captain John Green, Natal collided in fog with a fishing vessel. A court of inquiry convened to investigate the collision concluded that Natal′s speed of 10 knots (12 mph; 19 km/h) when she struck the fishing vessel was excessive for the foggy conditions, but the Admiralty declined to endorse this finding.

=== World War I ===
At the outbreak of war, she joined the Grand Fleet and in January 1915 was refitted at Cromarty. Natal spent much of 1915 uneventfully patrolling the North Sea until she began a brief refit at the Birkenhead shipyard of Cammell Laird on 22 November. On 5 December the ship rejoined the 2nd Cruiser Squadron at Scapa Flow. Twelve days later the squadron sailed to Cromarty Firth.

==== Sinking ====
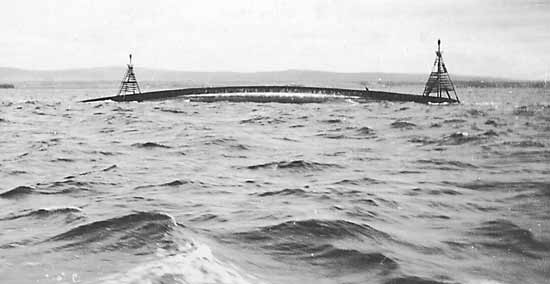
The upturned hull of Natal in Cromarty Firth

On 30 December 1915, Natal was lying in the Cromarty Firth with her squadron, under the command of Captain Eric Back. The captain was hosting a film party aboard and had invited the wives and children of his officers, one civilian friend and his family, and nurses from the nearby hospital ship Drina to attend. A total of seven women, one civilian male, and three children were in attendance that afternoon.

Shortly after 15:25, and without warning, a series of violent explosions tore through the rear part of the ship. She capsized five minutes later. Some thought that she had been torpedoed by a German U-boat or detonated a submarine-laid mine, but examination of the wreckage revealed that the explosions were internal. The divers sent to investigate the ship reported that the explosions began in either the rear 9.2-inch shellroom or the 3-pounder and small arms magazine. The Admiralty court-martial into the causes of her loss concluded that it was caused by an internal ammunition explosion, possibly due to faulty cordite. The Admiralty issued a revised list of the dead and missing that totaled 390 in January 1916, but did not list the women and children on board that day. Losses are listed from 390 to 421.

With her hull still visible at low water, it was Royal Navy practice on entering and leaving Cromarty right up to World War II for every warship to sound "Still", and for officers and men to come to attention as they passed the wreck. After numerous attempts, much of the ship was salvaged. The remainder was blown up in the 1970s to level the wreck so that it would not be a hazard to navigation.

== Legacy ==
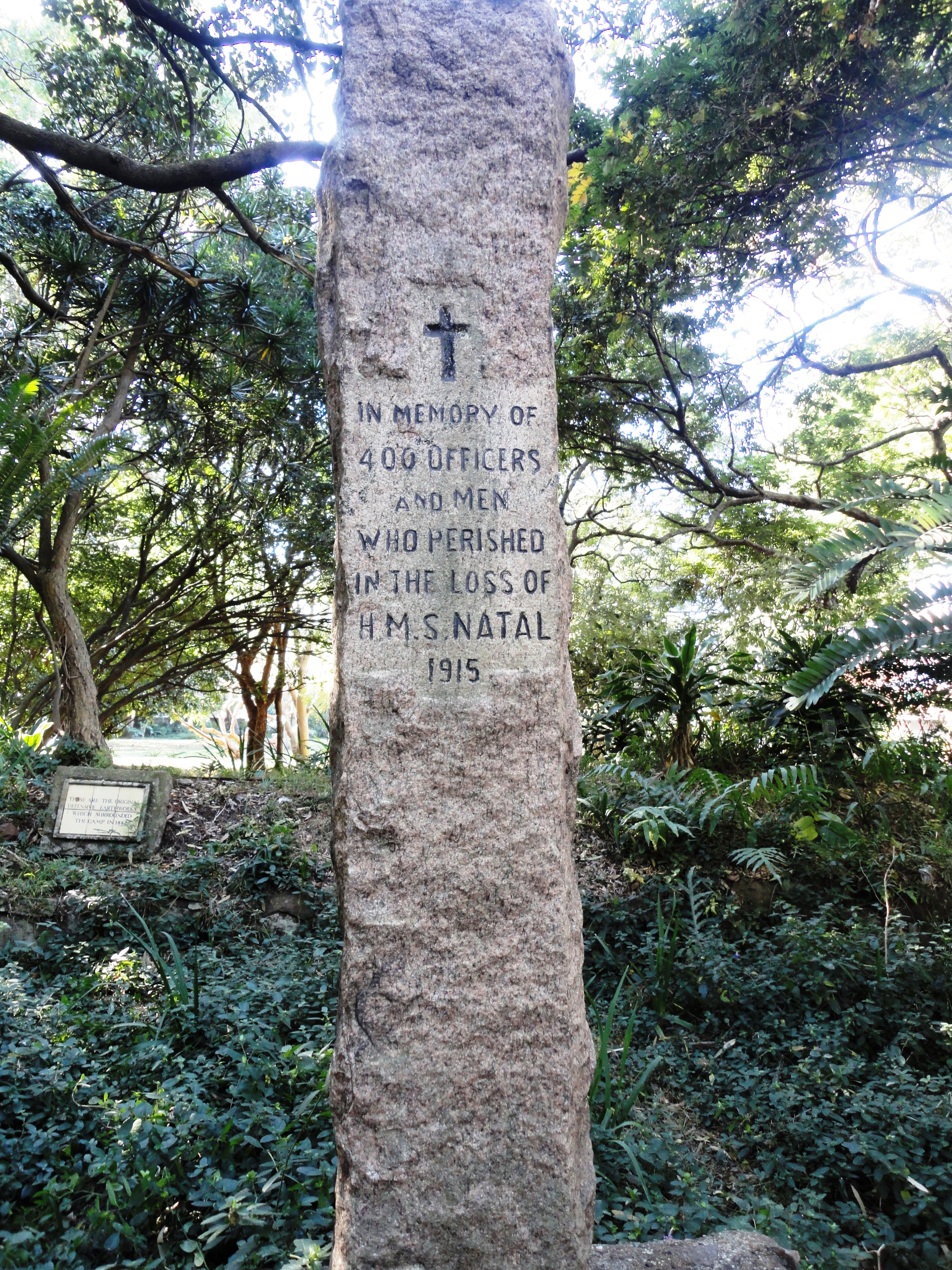
Memorial to the deceased, Durban

A memorial to the ship was erected in Durban in 1927. A garden known as Natal Gardens was opened on 15 July 2000 by celebrity gardener Charlie Dimmock, at Invergordon which contains a commemorative plaque remembering Natal. The plaque itself was unveiled in June 1992.

The wreck itself is now designated as a controlled site under the Protection of Military Remains Act 1986.
