= HMS Black Prince (1904) =

Duke of Edinburgh-class armoured cruiser

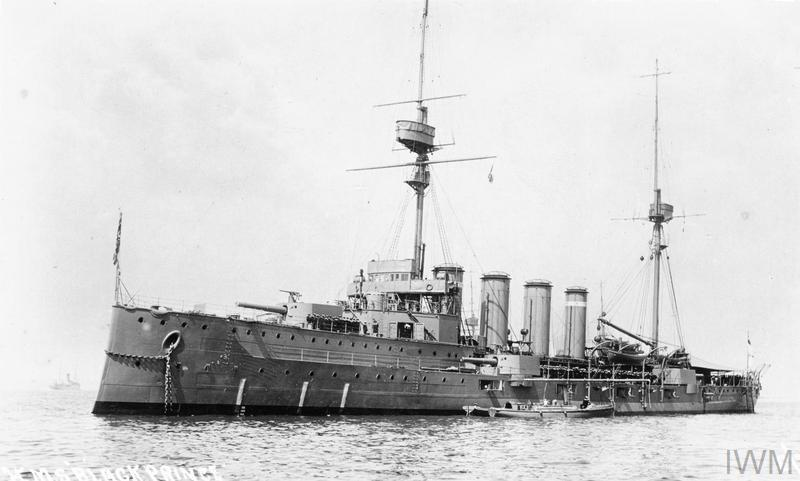
- Black Prince

History

United Kingdom
- Name: Black Prince
- Namesake: Edward, the Black Prince
- Builder: Thames Ironworks
- Laid down: 3 June 1903
- Launched: 8 November 1904
- Commissioned: 17 March 1906
- Fate: Sunk, 1 June 1916 at the Battle of Jutland

General characteristics
- Class & type: Duke of Edinburgh-class armoured cruiser
- Displacement: 12,590 long tons (12,790 t)
- Length: 505 ft 6 in (154.08 m) (o/a)
- Beam: 73 ft 6 in (22.4 m)
- Draught: 27 ft 6 in (8.4 m)
- Installed power: 26 boilers; 23,000 ihp (17,000 kW)
- Propulsion: 2 shafts; 2 triple-expansion steam engines
- Speed: 23 knots (43 km/h; 26 mph)
- Range: 8,130 nmi (15,060 km; 9,360 mi) at 10 knots (19 km/h; 12 mph)
- Complement: 769
- Armament: 6 × single 9.2 in (234 mm) guns; 10 × single 6 in (152 mm) guns; 20 × single 3 pdr (47 mm (1.9 in)) guns; 3 × 18 in (450 mm) torpedo tubes
- Armour: Waterline belt: 3–6 in (76–152 mm); Deck: .75–1.5 in (19–38 mm); Barbettes: 3–6 in (76–152 mm); Gun turrets: 4.5–7.5 in (114–191 mm); Conning tower: 10 in (254 mm); Bulkheads: 2–6 in (51–152 mm)

HMS Black Prince was a Duke of Edinburgh-class armoured cruiser built for the Royal Navy in the early 1900s. She was stationed in the Mediterranean when the First World War began and participated in the pursuit of the German battlecruiser SMS Goeben and light cruiser SMS Breslau. After the German ships reached Ottoman waters, the ship was sent to the Red Sea in mid-August to protect troop convoys arriving from India and to search for German merchant ships. After capturing two ships, Black Prince was transferred to the Grand Fleet in December 1914. She was sunk on 1 June 1916 during the Battle of Jutland with the loss of all hands.

== Design and description ==
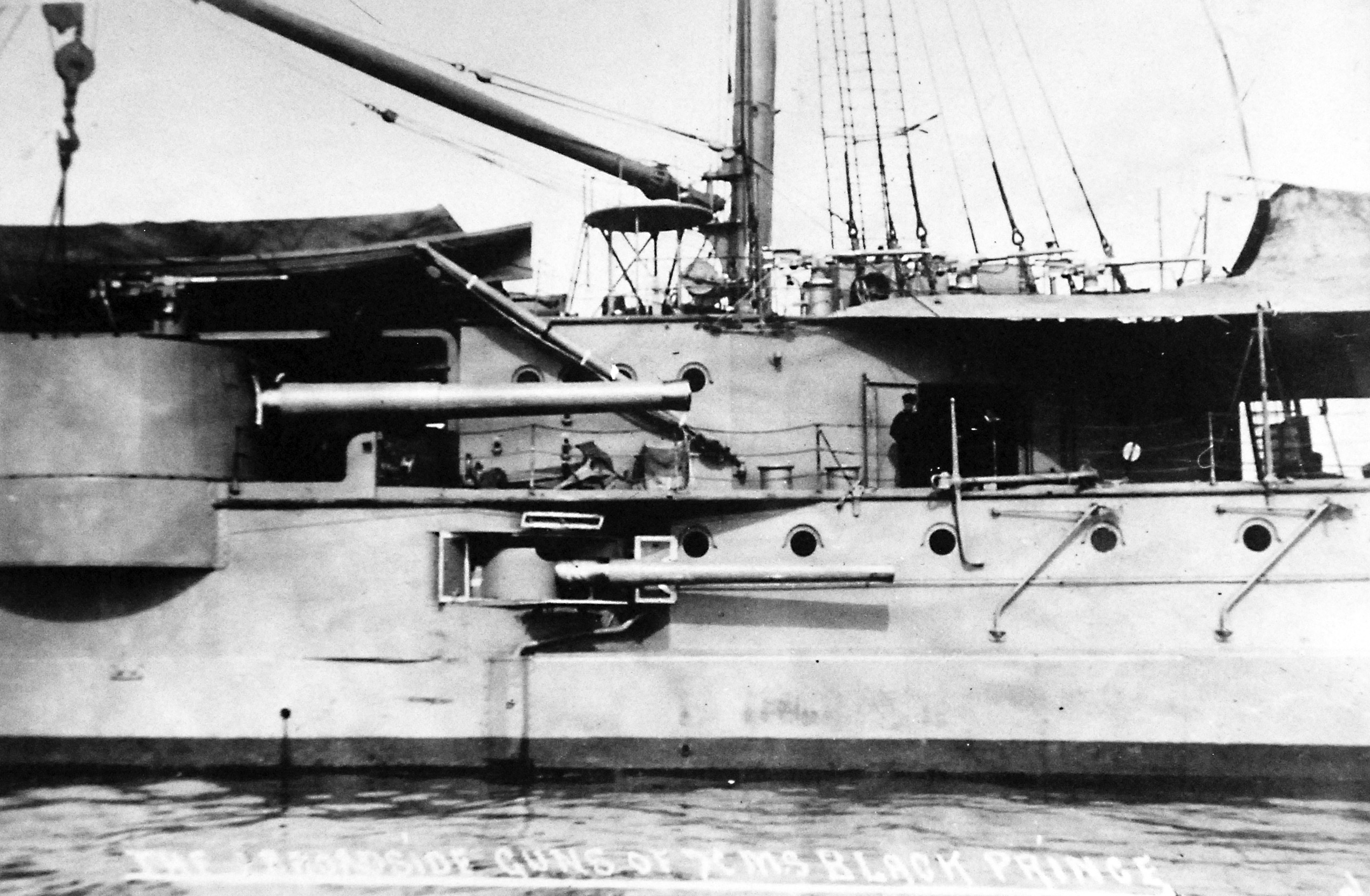
A view of her broadside guns

Two armoured cruisers of a new design, Duke of Edinburgh and Black Prince, the latter named for Edward, the Black Prince, were ordered for the Royal Navy as part of the 1902–03 Naval Estimates. They were the first ships to be designed for the Royal Navy under the supervision of the new Director of Naval Construction, Sir Philip Watts. The new design was significantly larger than the previous Monmouth and Devonshire-class cruisers, mounting a heavier main armament of six 9.2 in (234 mm) guns in single turrets.

Black Prince displaced 12,590 long tons (12,790 t) as built and 13,965 long tons (14,189 t) fully loaded. The ship had an overall length of 505 feet 6 inches (154.1 m), a beam of 73 feet 6 inches (22.4 m) and a draught of 27 feet (8.2 m). She was powered by four-cylinder triple-expansion steam engines, driving two shafts, which produced a total of 23,000 indicated horsepower (17,000 kW) and gave a maximum speed of 23 knots (43 km/h; 26 mph). The engines were powered by 20 Babcock & Wilcox water-tube boilers and six cylindrical boilers. The ship carried a maximum of 2,150 long tons (2,180 t) of coal and an additional 600 long tons (610 t) of fuel oil that was sprayed on the coal to increase its burn rate. At full capacity, she could steam for 8,130 nautical miles (15,060 km; 9,360 mi) at a speed of 10 knots (19 km/h; 12 mph). The ship's complement was 789 officers and ratings.

Her main armament consisted of six BL 9.2-inch Mk X guns in single turrets, two on the centreline and two on each beam, giving a broadside of four 9.2 in guns. Her secondary armament of ten BL 6-inch Mark XI guns was arranged in single casemates. They were mounted amidships on the main deck and were only usable in calm weather. Twenty Vickers QF 3-pounders were fitted, six on turret roofs and fourteen in the superstructure. The ship also mounted three submerged 18-inch torpedo tubes.

== Construction and career ==
Black Prince was laid down on 3 June 1903 at the Thames Ironworks and Shipbuilding Company's shipyard at Blackwall, London. She was launched on 8 November 1904 and completed on 17 March 1906. When completed, Black Prince served with the 2nd Squadron until 1907, the 1st Cruiser Squadron from 1907 to 1908, the 5th Cruiser Squadron (as part of the Atlantic Fleet) from 1908 to 1912 and the Third from 1912 to 1913.

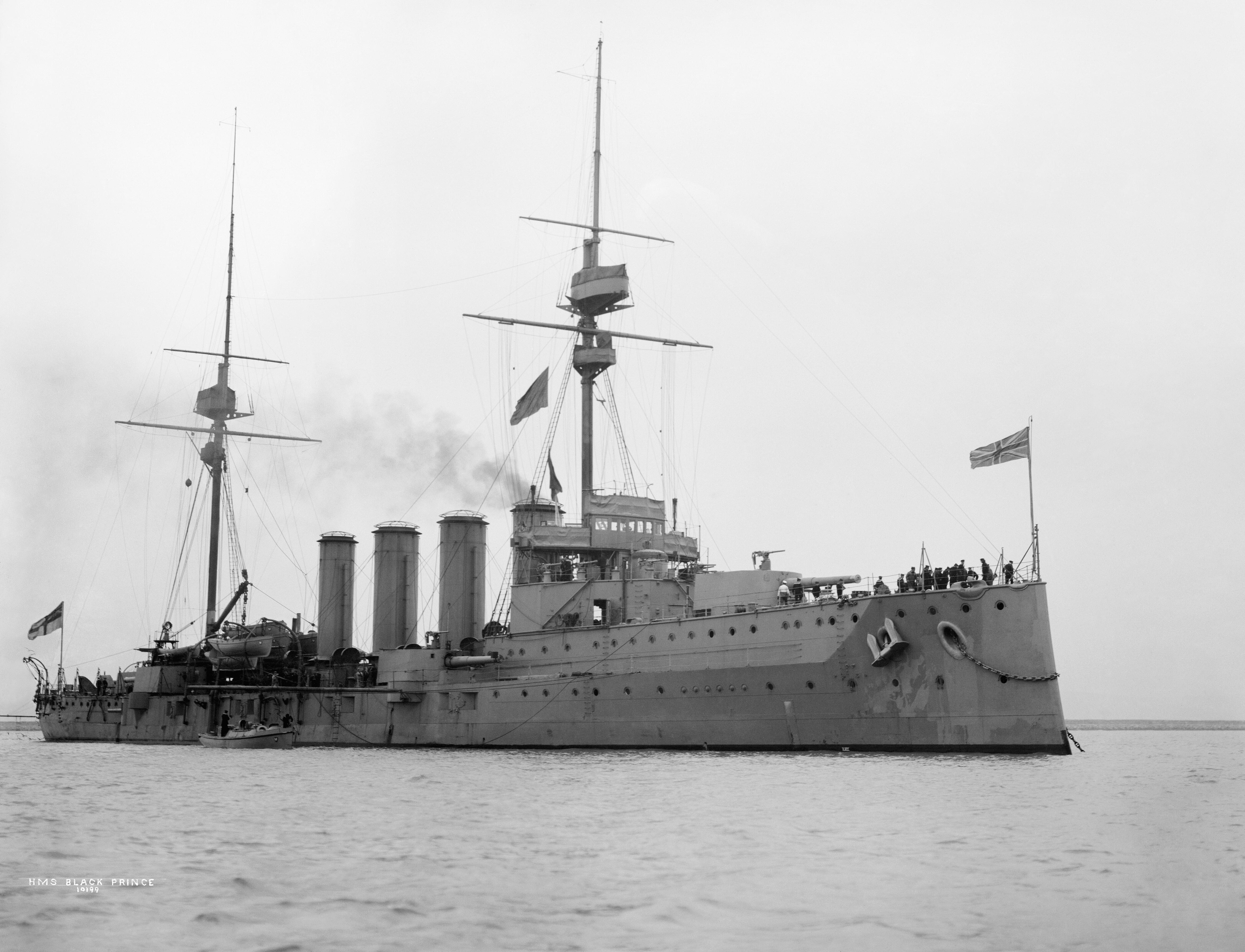
Black Prince at anchor in 1914

At the beginning of the First World War, Black Prince was one of the four armoured cruisers serving in the 1st Cruiser Squadron of the Mediterranean Fleet, commanded by Rear-Admiral Ernest Charles Thomas Troubridge. She participated in the pursuit of Goeben and Breslau. Following the escape of the two German ships to neutral Turkey, Black Prince and Duke of Edinburgh were sent into the Red Sea to search for German merchant ships, with Black Prince capturing the German ocean liners Südmark and Istria. On 6 November, she was ordered to Gibraltar to join a squadron of French and British ships to search for German warships still at sea off the African coast. This was cancelled on 19 November after the location of the German East Asia Squadron was revealed by survivors of the Battle of Coronel. Black Prince joined the Grand Fleet in December 1914 and was assigned to the 1st Cruiser Squadron under Rear-Admiral Sir Robert Keith Arbuthnot.

Black Prince was modified in March 1916 as a result of lessons learned at the Battle of Coronel, with the 6-inch guns removed from their casemates and replaced by six 6-inch guns mounted individually behind shields between the beam 9.2-inch turrets.

=== Loss ===
The ship participated in the Battle of Jutland, where she was sunk with the loss of her entire crew. The circumstances under which she sank were mysterious for some years after. As the British had lost contact and did not see the ship destroyed, they were unsure as to whether a submarine or surface ship was responsible for sinking Black Prince. During the battle, the 1st Cruiser Squadron was deployed as part of a screening force several miles ahead of the main force of the Grand Fleet, but Black Prince lost contact with the rest of the Squadron as it came into contact with German forces, at about 17:42. Soon after, two other members of the 1st Cruiser Squadron, Defence and Warrior, were heavily engaged by German battleships and battlecruisers, with Defence blowing up and Warrior receiving heavy damage, which later caused her to sink.

There were no positive sightings of Black Prince by the British fleet after that, although a wireless signal from her was received at 20:45, reporting a submarine sighting. During the night of 31 May–1 June, the British destroyer Spitfire, badly damaged after colliding with the German battleship Nassau, sighted what appeared to be a German battlecruiser, with two widely spaced funnels, described as being "...a mass of fire from foremast to mainmast, on deck and between decks. Flames were issuing out of her from every corner." The mystery ship exploded at about midnight. It was later thought that the burning ship may have been Black Prince, with the two midships funnels having collapsed or been shot away.

Recent historians, however, hold to the German account of the ship's sinking. Black Prince briefly engaged the German battleship Rheinland at about 23:35 GMT, scoring two hits with 6-inch shells. Separated from the rest of the British fleet, Black Prince approached the German lines shortly after midnight. She turned away from the German battleships, but it was too late. The German battleship Thüringen fixed Black Prince in her searchlights and opened fire. Up to five other German ships, including the battleships Nassau, Ostfriesland, and Friedrich der Grosse, joined in the bombardment, with return fire from Black Prince being ineffective. Most of the German ships were between 750 and 1,500 yards (700 and 1,350 m) of Black Prince – effectively point-blank range for contemporary naval gunnery. The ship was hit by at least twelve heavy shells and several smaller ones, sinking within 15 minutes. There were no survivors from her crew of 857. The wrecksite is designated as a protected place under the Protection of Military Remains Act 1986.

== Popular culture ==
In the first episode of Series 4 of the SBS-TV (Australia) series Who Do You Think You Are?, Australian writer-actor-comedian Shaun Micallef discovered that his great-grandfather Giovanni (John) Micallef, a steward on Black Prince, was among those killed.
