= 1st Division (Royal Navy) =

- Active: March 1909–April 1912
- Country: United Kingdom
- Branch: Royal Navy
- Type: Division

The 1st Division was a formation of the Home Fleet of the Royal Navy. It briefly existed before the First World War from 1909 to 1912.

== History ==
In March 1909 following a Navy re-organisation, the Home Fleet absorbed the Channel Fleet, which became its First and Second divisions. Each division consisted of A battle squadron that had eight ships. This was essentially a reserve force allocated to major home commands. The new Dreadnought class battleships were allocated to the 1st Battle Squadron - 1st Division, Home Fleet. The Royal Navy's Battle Cruisers were posted to the 1st Cruiser Squadron. The Atlantic Fleet managed to survive the organisational changes. The first division existed until 1912 when it re-styled 1st Battle Squadron.

== Rear-Admirals in the 1st Division ==
Post holders included:

	Rank	Flag	Name	Term
Rear-Admirals in the First Division
1	Rear-Admiral	Rear-Admiral - Royal Navy	Charles J. Briggs	March, 1909 - 5 January, 1910
2	Rear-Admiral	Rear-Admiral - Royal Navy	F. C. Doveton Sturdee	5 January, 1910 - 5 January, 1911
3	Rear-Admiral	Rear-Admiral - Royal Navy	Richard H. Peirse	5 January, 1911 - 5 January, 1912
4	Rear-Admiral	Rear-Admiral - Royal Navy	Charles E. Madden	5 January, 1912 -May 1912

== Components ==
Included

	Unit	Notes
1	1st Battle Squadron, 1st Division	8 (dreadnoughts)
2	1st Cruiser Squadron	(6 battle cruisers)
3	1st Destroyer Flotilla	(4 cruiser leaders & 19 destroyers )
