= 1st Cruiser Squadron =

- Active: 1904–1952
- Country: United Kingdom
- Allegiance: British Empire
- Branch: Royal Navy
- Engagements: Battle of Dogger Bank; Battle of Jutland

The First Cruiser Squadron was a Royal Navy squadron of cruisers that saw service as part of the Grand Fleet during World War I, then later as part of the Mediterranean during the Interwar period and World War II. It was first established in 1904 and existed until 1952.

== History ==
=== First formation ===
The squadron was formed in December 1904 when Cruiser Squadron was re-designated the 1st Cruiser Squadron. In March 1909, then consisting of battlecruisers, it was assigned to the 1st Division of the Home Fleet until April 1912. When the First World War began, the squadron was assigned to the Mediterranean Fleet where it participated in the pursuit of the German battlecruiser SMS Goeben and the light cruiser SMS Breslau. It joined then Grand Fleet in January 1915 where it participated in the battles of Dogger Bank and the Battle of Jutland. It was disbanded after the battle as three of its four ships had been sunk in June 1916. In July 1917 H.M. Ships Courageous, Glorious and Furious were detached from the 3rd Light Cruiser Squadron and named the First Cruiser Squadron, part of the newly formed Light Cruiser Force. It remained part of Light Cruiser Force until April 1919 when it was once again disbanded.

==== Rear/Vice Admiral commanding ====
Post holders included:

	Rank	Flag	Name	Term
Rear-Admiral/Vice-Admiral Commanding, 1st Cruiser Squadron
1	Rear-Admiral	Rear-Admiral - Royal Navy	Edmund S. Poe	December, 1904 - July, 1905
2	Rear-Admiral	Rear-Admiral - Royal Navy	George Neville	July, 1905 - July, 1907
3	Rear-Admiral	Rear-Admiral - Royal Navy	Sir Percy M. Scott	July, 1907 - September, 1908
4	Rear-Admiral	Rear-Admiral - Royal Navy	Charles H. Adair	September, 1908 - February, 1909
5	Rear-Admiral	Rear-Admiral - Royal Navy	Hon. Stanley C. J. Colville	February, 1909 - February, 1911
6	Rear-Admiral	Rear-Admiral - Royal Navy	Lewis Bayly	February, 1911 - January, 1913
7	Rear-Admiral	Rear-Admiral - Royal Navy	Ernest C.T. Troubridge	January, 1913 - September, 1914
8	Rear-Admiral	Rear-Admiral - Royal Navy	Sir Archibald G. H.W. Moore	November, 1914 - January, 1915
9	Rear-Admiral	Rear-Admiral - Royal Navy	Sir Robert K. Arbuthnot †	January, 1915 - May, 1916
squadron disbanded 06/1916 - 06/1917
10	Vice-Admiral	Vice-Admiral - Royal Navy	Trevylyan D.W.Napier	July, 1917 - April, 1919
squadron disbanded 1919-1924

==== Composition, April–May 1907 ====
As per:

- Good Hope
- Roxburgh
- Hampshire
- Argyll

==== Composition, First World War ====
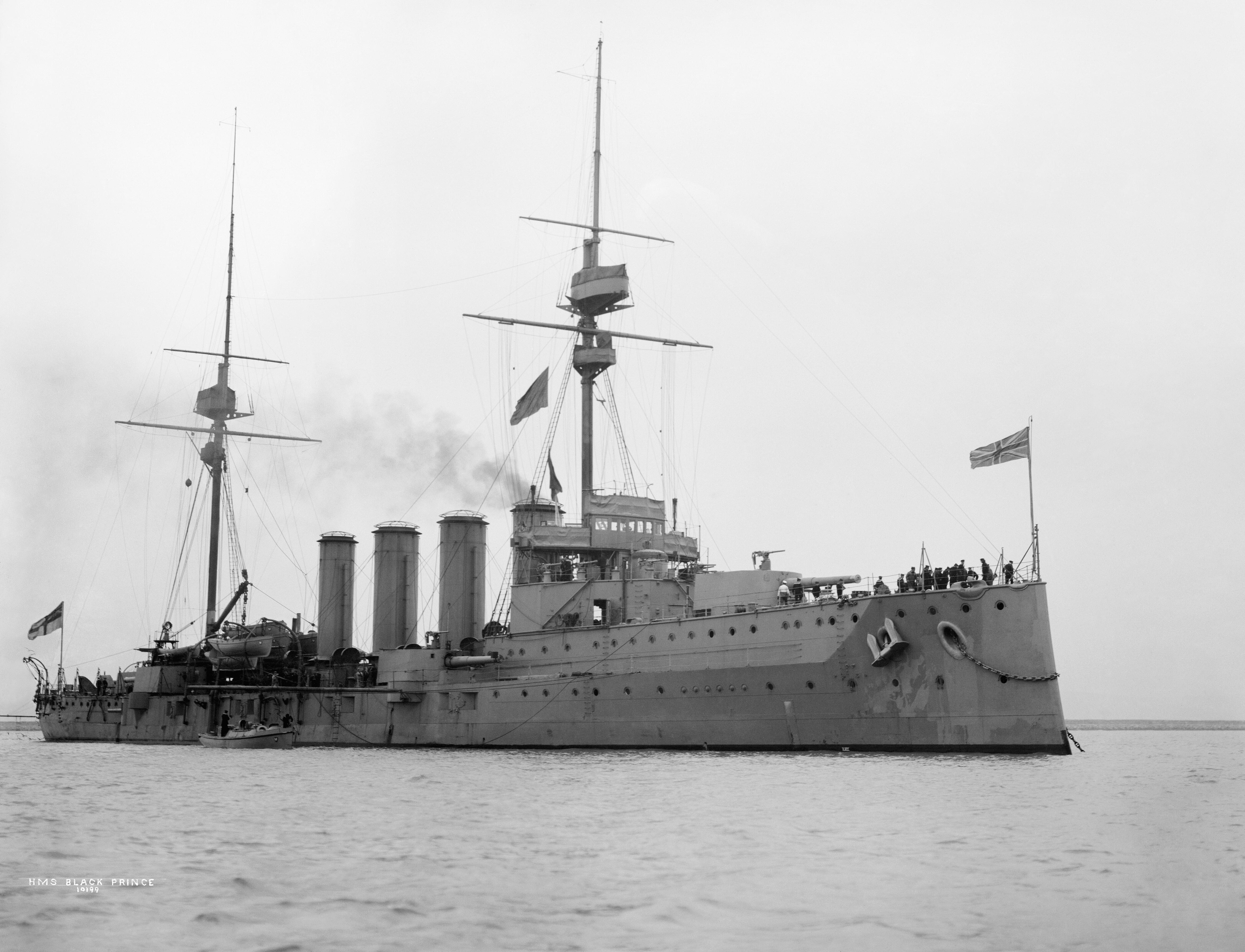
HMS Black Prince

===== August 1914 =====
As of:

Armoured cruisers

- Defence - Flagship of Rear-Admiral Ernest C. T. Troubridge. Captain Fawcet Wray
- Black Prince - Captain Frederick D. Gilpin-Brown
- Duke of Edinburgh - Captain Henry Blackett
- Warrior - Captain George H. Borrett

Light cruisers

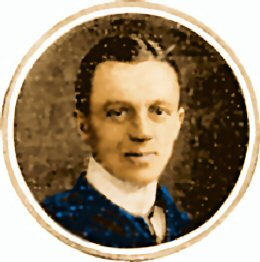
Commander Sidney R. Drury-Lowe, R. N.

- Chatham - Captain Sidney R. Drury-Lowe
- Dublin - Captain John D. Kelly
- Gloucester - Captain Howard Kelly
- Weymouth - Captain William D. Church

===== 24 January 1915 =====
As of:

- Duke of Edinburgh - Temporary flagship of Rear-Admiral Sir Robert K. Arbuthnot
- Black Prince
- Warrior

===== 22 February 1915 =====
As of:

- Defence - Flagship of Rear-Admiral Sir Robert K. Arbuthnot
- Duke of Edinburgh
- Black Prince
- Warrior

===== 30 May 1916 =====
As of:

- Defence - Flagship of Rear-Admiral Sir Robert K. Arbuthnot. Captain Stanley Venn Ellis
- Duke of Edinburgh
- Black Prince
- Warrior

===== October 1917 =====
As of:

- Courageous
- Glorious
- Furious

===== 17 November 1917 =====
As of:

- Courageous
- Glorious

=== Second formation ===
In October 1924 the 1st Light Cruiser Squadron was re-designated the 1st Cruiser Squadron. This took effect in November 1924 and the squadron was reformed as an enlarged unit of the Mediterranean Fleet under the command of Rear Admiral Arthur Waistell.

In June 1942 the squadron under the commander of Rear-Admiral Louis Keppel Hamilton was assigned to provide distant cover for Convoy PQ 17. The squadron consisted of the British cruisers HMS London (flagship) and Norfolk, the American cruisers USS Wichita and Tuscaloosa and four destroyers, two from the United States Navy. Louis Mountbatten served as commander of the squadron in the Mediterranean Fleet after the war. Having been granted the substantive rank of vice admiral on 22 June 1949, Mountbatten became Second-in-Command of the Mediterranean Fleet in April 1950.

==== Rear/Vice Admiral commanding ====
Post holders included:

	Rank	Flag	Name	Term
Rear-Admiral/Vice-Admiral Commanding, 1st Cruiser Squadron
1	Rear-Admiral	Rear-Admiral - Royal Navy	Arthur K.Waistell	November, 1924 - October, 1926
2	Rear-Admiral	Rear-Admiral - Royal Navy	William H.D. Boyle	October, 1926 - October, 1928
3	Rear-Admiral	Rear-Admiral - Royal Navy	Henry W. Parker	October, 1928 - March, 1930
4	Rear-Admiral	Rear-Admiral - Royal Navy	Joseph Henley C. W. Henley	March, 1930 -April 1932
5	Rear-Admiral	Rear-Admiral - Royal Navy	George K. Chetwode	April, 1932 - June, 1933
6	Vice-Admiral	Vice-Admiral - Royal Navy	John K. im Thurn	June, 1933 - July, 1935
7	Vice-Admiral	Vice-Admiral - Royal Navy	Max K. Horton	July, 1935 - October, 1936
8	Vice-Admiral	Vice-Admiral - Royal Navy	Charles E.Kennedy-Purvis	October, 1936-September, 1938
9	Vice-Admiral	Vice-Admiral - Royal Navy	John H. D. Cunningham	September, 1938 - December, 1940
10	Rear-Admiral	Rear-Admiral - Royal Navy	W. Frederic Wake-Walker	December, 1940 - February 1942
11	Rear-Admiral	Rear-Admiral - Royal Navy	Louis H.K. Hamilton	February 1942 - August, 1943
12	Vice-Admiral	Vice-Admiral - Royal Navy	Arthur F.E. Palliser	August, 1943 - March, 1944
13	Vice-Admiral	Vice-Admiral - Royal Navy	Sir Rhoderick R. McGrigor	March, 1944 - July 1945
14	Rear-Admiral	Rear-Admiral - Royal Navy	Harold R.G. Kinahan	June, 1946 - June, 1947
15	Rear-Admiral	Rear-Admiral - Royal Navy	Richard V. Symonds-Tayler	June, 1947 - October, 1948
16	Vice-Admiral	Vice-Admiral - Royal Navy	Earl Mountbatten of Burma	October, 1948 - May, 1950
17	Rear-Admiral	Rear-Admiral - Royal Navy	C.T. Mark Pizey	May, 1950 - July, 1951
18	Vice-Admiral	Vice-Admiral - Royal Navy	Ralph A.B. Edwards	July, 1951 – 1952

== Deployments ==
Included:

from	to	deployed to	notes
March 1909	April 1912	1st Division, Home Fleet	
July 1914	January 1915	Mediterranean Fleet	
January 1915	June 1916	Grand Fleet	
July 1917	April 1919	Light Cruiser Force	
November 1924	August 1939	Mediterranean Fleet	
August 1939	1952	Home Fleet	
