= HMS Warrior (1905) =

1905 British armoured cruiser

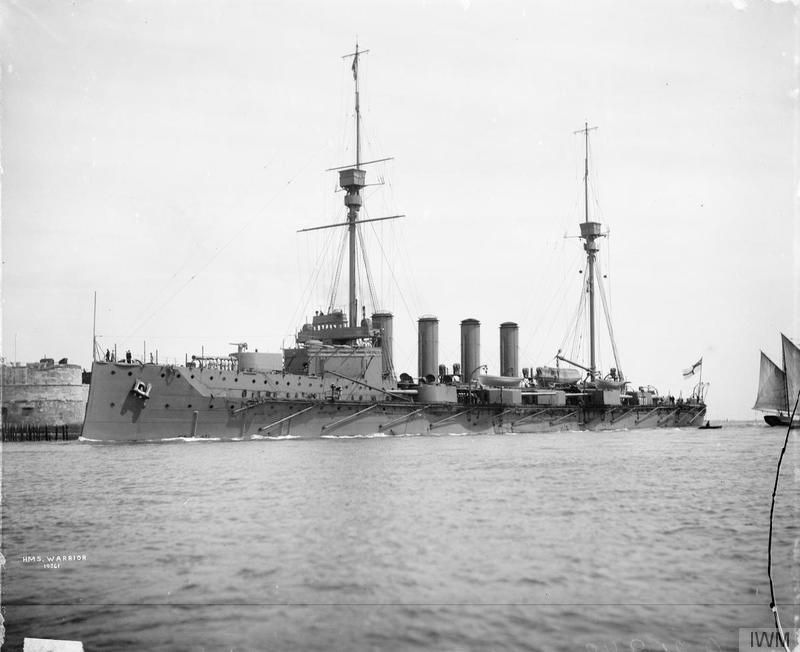
- Warrior off the Round Tower, Portsmouth

History

United Kingdom
- Name: HMS Warrior
- Ordered: 1903–04 Naval Programme
- Builder: Pembroke Dock
- Laid down: 5 November 1903
- Launched: 25 November 1905
- Commissioned: 12 December 1906
- Fate: Sank 1 June 1916, after the Battle of Jutland

General characteristics
- Class & type: Warrior-class armoured cruiser
- Displacement: 13,550 long tons (13,770 t) (normal); 14,500 long tons (14,700 t) (deep load)
- Length: 505 ft 4 in (154.0 m)
- Beam: 73 ft 6 in (22.4 m)
- Draught: 27 ft 6 in (8.4 m) (maximum)
- Installed power: 23,650 ihp (17,640 kW)
- Propulsion: 2 shafts, 4-cylinder triple-expansion steam engines; 19 Yarrow water-tube boilers and 6 cylindrical boilers
- Speed: 23 knots (43 km/h; 26 mph)
- Range: 7,960 nmi (14,740 km; 9,160 mi) at 10 knots (19 km/h; 12 mph)
- Complement: 712
- Armament: 6 × 1 - BL 9.2-inch (234 mm) Mk X guns; 4 × 1 - BL 7.5-inch (191 mm) Mk II or Mk V guns; 26 × 1 - QF 3-pounder (47 mm) guns; 3 × 1 - submerged 18-inch (450-mm) torpedo tubes
- Armour: Belt: 3–6 in (76–152 mm); Decks: 0.75–1.5 in (19–38 mm); Barbettes: 3–6 in (76–152 mm); Turrets: 4.5–7.5 in (110–190 mm); Conning tower: 10 in (250 mm); Bulkheads: 2–6 in (51–152 mm)

HMS Warrior was a Warrior-class armoured cruiser built for the Royal Navy in the first decade of the 20th century. She was stationed in the Mediterranean when the First World War began and participated in the pursuit of the German battlecruiser SMS Goeben and light cruiser SMS Breslau. Warrior was transferred to the Grand Fleet in December 1914 and remained there for the rest of her career. She was heavily damaged during the Battle of Jutland in 1916, after which she withdrew and was later abandoned and sank in a rising sea.

== Description ==
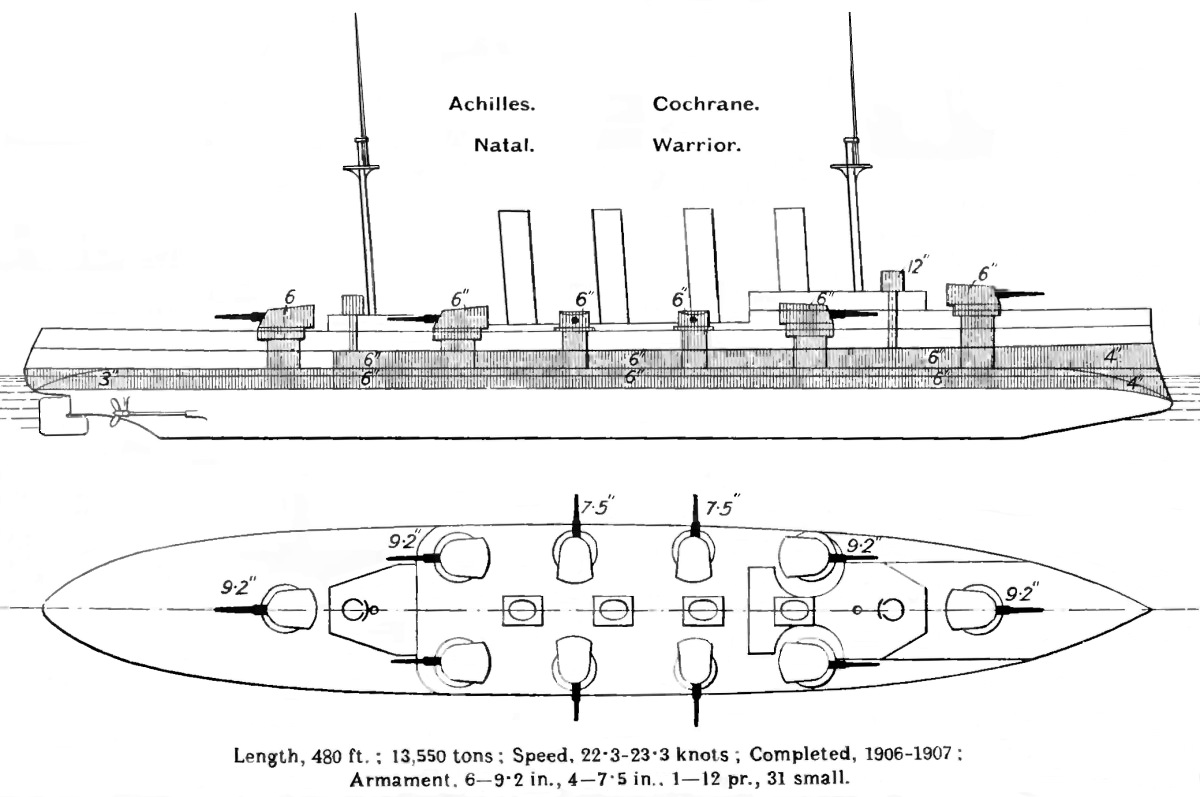
Right elevation and plan view from Brassey's Naval Annual; the shaded areas show her armouring

Warrior displaced 13,550 long tons (13,770 t) as built and 14,500 long tons (14,700 t) fully loaded. The ship had an overall length of 505 feet 4 inches (154.0 m), a beam of 73 feet 6 inches (22.4 m) and a draught of 27 feet 6 inches (8.4 m). She was powered by four-cylinder triple-expansion steam engines, driving two shafts, which developed a total of 23,650 indicated horsepower (17,640 kW) and gave a maximum speed of 23.3 knots (43.2 km/h; 26.8 mph). The engines were powered by 19 Yarrow water-tube boilers and six cylindrical boilers. The ship carried a maximum of 2,050 long tons (2,080 t) of coal and an additional 600 long tons (610 t) of fuel oil that was sprayed on the coal to increase its burn rate. At full capacity, she could steam for 7,960 nautical miles (14,740 km; 9,160 mi) at a speed of 10 knots (19 km/h; 12 mph).

=== Armament ===
Her main armament consisted of six BL 9.2-inch Mk X guns in single Mk V turrets; two on the centreline (one each fore and aft) and four in the corners about the funnels. Her secondary armament of four BL 7.5-inch Mk II or Mk V guns in single Mk II turrets was carried amidships, between the wing 9.2-inch guns. Twenty-six Vickers QF 3-pounders were fitted, ten on turret roofs and eight each on the forward and aft superstructures. The last four ships of the Duke of Edinburgh-class cruisers had a secondary armament of turreted 7.5-inch guns rather than the 6-inch (152 mm) guns in casemates of the first two ships; these latter four were sometimes referred to as the Warrior class. Because of the extra topweight of the turrets in comparison to their half-sisters their stability was reduced which made them very good seaboats and steady gun platforms. The ship also mounted three submerged 17.7-inch (450 mm) torpedo tubes, one of which was mounted in the stern.

== Service ==
Warrior was ordered as part of the 1903–04 naval construction programme as the first of four armoured cruisers and laid down on 5 November 1903 at Pembroke Dockyard. Her eponym, the once-innovative armoured frigate (at the time converted to a depot ship) HMS Warrior, was renamed to HMS Vernon III in 1904 to free up the name. She was launched on 25 November 1905 and completed on 12 December 1906. On completion, Warrior was assigned to the 5th Cruiser Squadron in the Channel Fleet until 1909, when she was transferred to the 2nd Cruiser Squadron. On 15 September 1909 one of Warrior's boiler tubes failed during firing practice, and she was repaired at Devonport Dockyard. In 1913 the ship was transferred to the 1st Cruiser Squadron of the Mediterranean Fleet. She was involved in the pursuit of the German battlecruiser Goeben and light cruiser Breslau at the outbreak of World War I, but was ordered not to engage them. Warrior participated in the Allied sweep which led to the sinking of the Austro-Hungarian light cruiser SMS Zenta during the Battle of Antivari in August 1914. A few days later she was ordered to Suez to defend the Suez Canal against any Turkish attack and remained there until 6 November when she was ordered to Gibraltar to join a squadron of French and British ship to search for German warships still at sea off the African coast. This was cancelled on 19 November after the location of the German East Asia Squadron was revealed by survivors of the Battle of Coronel.

Warrior joined the Grand Fleet in December 1914 and was assigned to the 1st Cruiser Squadron under Rear-Admiral Sir Robert Keith Arbuthnot. At the Battle of Jutland on 31 May 1916, the 1st Cruiser Squadron was in front of the Grand Fleet, on the right side. At 5:47 p.m., (Note: The times used in this article are in UTC, which is one hour behind CET, which is often used in German works.) the squadron flagship, HMS Defence, and Warrior spotted the German II Scouting Group and opened fire. Their shells felt short and the two ships turned to port in pursuit, cutting in front of the battlecruiser HMS Lion, which was forced to turn away to avoid a collision. Shortly afterwards they spotted the disabled German light cruiser SMS Wiesbaden and closed to engage. When the two ships reached a range of 5,500 yards (5,000 m) from Wiesbaden they were spotted in turn at 6:05 by the German battlecruiser SMS Derfflinger and four battleships who were less than 8,000 yards (7,300 m) away. The fire from the German ships was heavy and Defence blew up at 6:20. Warrior was hit by at least fifteen 28-centimetre (11 in) and six 15-centimetre (5.9 in) shells, but was saved when the German ships switched their fire to the battleship HMS Warspite when its steering jammed and caused Warspite to make two complete circles within sight of much of the High Seas Fleet.

Warrior was heavily damaged by the German shells, which caused large fires and heavy flooding, although the engine room crew - of whom only three survived - kept the engines running for long enough to allow her to withdraw to the west. She was taken in tow by the seaplane tender HMS Engadine who took off her surviving crew of 743. She was abandoned in a rising sea at 8:25 a.m. on 1 June when her upper deck was only 4 feet (1.2 m) above the water, and subsequently foundered.

== Wreck Discovery ==
On 8 September 2016 Dr Innes McCartney of Bournemouth University announced that he and a team from the Sea War Museum Jutland had discovered the wreck of the Warrior. The wreck was discovered in a search on 24 August 2016. The ship lies completely upside down, at a depth of 80 meters in an area of soft sea bed, up to the level of the upper deck. The ship appears to be largely intact, with no sign of the illegal metal salvage that has occurred on other Jutland wrecks. Warrior is the last of the 25 ships sunk at the Battle of Jutland to be located. There are concerns that the wreck may be exploited by illegal metal scavengers, despite the wreck being protected by the Protection of Military Remains Act 1986.
