= Duke of Edinburgh-class cruiser =

British class of armoured cruisers

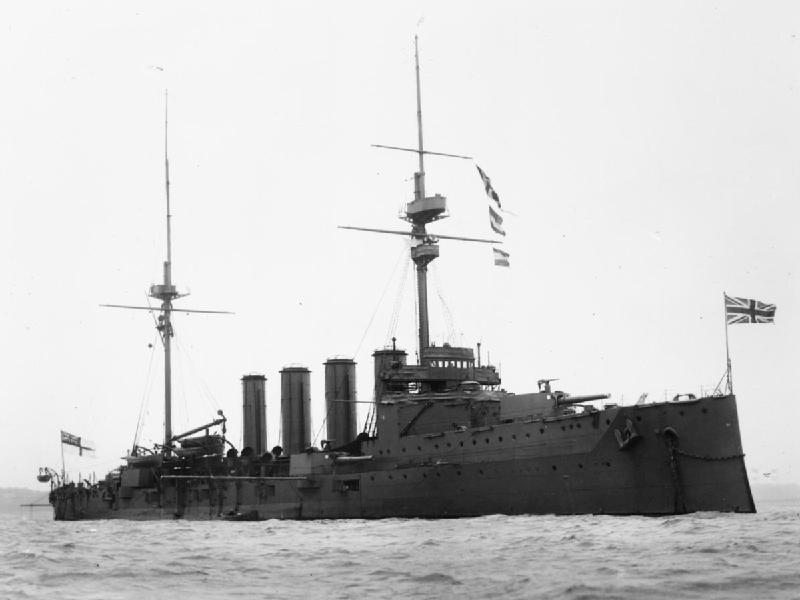
- Duke of Edinburgh at anchor

Class overview
- Name: Duke of Edinburgh
- Builders: Pembroke Dockyard; Thames Ironworks
- Operators: Royal Navy
- Preceded by: Devonshire class
- Succeeded by: Warrior class
- Built: 1903–1906
- In service: 1906–1919
- Completed: 2
- Lost: 1
- Scrapped: 1

General characteristics
- Type: Armoured cruiser
- Displacement: 12,590 long tons (12,790 t)
- Length: 505 ft 6 in (154.08 m) (o/a)
- Beam: 73 ft 6 in (22.4 m)
- Draught: 27 ft 6 in (8.4 m)
- Installed power: 26 boilers; 23,000 ihp (17,000 kW)
- Propulsion: 2 shafts; 2 triple-expansion steam engines
- Speed: 23 knots (43 km/h; 26 mph)
- Range: 8,130 nmi (15,060 km; 9,360 mi) at 10 knots (19 km/h; 12 mph)
- Complement: 769
- Armament: 6 × single 9.2 in (234 mm) guns; 10 × single 6 in (152 mm) guns; 20 × single 3 pdr (47 mm (1.9 in)) guns; 3 × 18 in (450 mm) torpedo tubes
- Armour: Waterline belt: 3–6 in (76–152 mm); Deck: .75–1.5 in (19–38 mm); Barbettes: 3–6 in (76–152 mm); Gun turrets: 4.5–7.5 in (114–191 mm); Conning tower: 10 in (254 mm); Bulkheads: 2–6 in (51–152 mm)

The Duke of Edinburgh-class cruiser was a class of two armoured cruisers built for the Royal Navy in the first decade of the 20th century. They were the first British armoured cruisers designed to work with the battlefleet rather than protect merchant shipping. After commissioning, they were assigned to the Atlantic, Channel and Home Fleets until 1913 when they were transferred to the Mediterranean Fleet. After the start of World War I in August 1914, the sister ships participated in the pursuit of the German battlecruiser SMS Goeben and light cruiser SMS Breslau. After the German ships reached their refuge in Ottoman Turkey, the ships were ordered to the Red Sea for convoy escort duties. They captured three German merchant ships before they returned to home at the end of the year.

The sisters participated in the Battle of Jutland in May 1916 where Black Prince was sunk with all hands. Duke of Edinburgh spent the next year on blockade duties in the North Sea before she was transferred to the Atlantic Ocean on convoy escort duties for the rest of the war. She was sold for scrap in 1920.

== Design and description ==
After the preceding Devonshire class, the Royal Navy rethought how it planned to use its armoured cruisers. It decided that they were going to form a fast wing of the battlefleet, which meant that they required heavier armour and armament to fight their counterparts in opposing fleets (thus necessitating larger hulls and higher costs). Two armoured cruisers were planned for the 1902–1903 Naval Programme and the newly appointed Director of Naval Construction, Philip Watts designed what naval historian Oscar Parkes called: "cruiser editions of the King Edward VII-class battleships". In these, his first design, he perpetuated the worst feature of the designs by his predecessor, Sir William White, by placing the secondary armament of six-inch (150 mm) guns in embrasures a deck below the main armament which meant that the guns were inoperable in anything more than a dead calm sea. A solution for this problem was offered after construction began when Watts learned that the ships would be lighter than expected and that weight would be available to replace the six-inch guns with 7.5-inch (190 mm) guns raised to the same deck as the main armament. The change would cost a total of £398,000 for the two ships, far too expensive for the Board of Admiralty, so it was rejected on 30 March 1904.

The Duke of Edinburgh-class ships were designed to displace 13,550 long tons (13,770 t), but they proved to be significantly lighter as built, displacing 12,590 long tons (12,790 t) at normal load and 13,965 long tons (14,189 t) fully loaded. The ships had an overall length of 505 feet 6 inches (154.1 m) and a length between perpendiculars of 480 ft (146.3 m). They had a beam of 73 feet 6 inches (22.4 m) and a deep draught of 26 feet 6 inches (8.1 m) forward and 27 feet 6 inches (8.4 m) aft. The class was over 30 feet (9.1 m) longer overall than the Devonshires and displaced over 2,500 long tons (2,540 t) more.

The ships' complement was 769 officers and enlisted men. They rolled quickly with a metacentric height of 4.2 feet (1.3 m) at deep load and their six-inch guns were as wet as predicted.

The cruisers were powered by two 4-cylinder triple-expansion steam engines, each driving one shaft, which produced a total of 23,000 indicated horsepower (17,150 kW) and gave a maximum speed of 23 knots (43 km/h; 26 mph). The engines were powered by 20 Babcock & Wilcox water-tube boilers and six cylindrical boilers. The ships carried a maximum of 2,150 long tons (2,180 t) of coal and an additional 600 long tons (610 t) of fuel oil that was sprayed on the coal to increase its burn rate. At full capacity, they could steam for 8,130 nautical miles (15,060 km; 9,360 mi) at a speed of 10 knots (19 km/h; 12 mph).

=== Armament ===
The Duke of Edinburgh's main armament consisted of six 45-calibre BL 9.2-inch Mk X guns in single-gun turrets, a much more powerful gun than used in the Devonshires. The guns were distributed in two centreline turrets, one each fore and one aft of the superstructure, and four wing turrets disposed in the corners about the funnels. The centreline turrets could traverse a total of 285° while the wing turrets were limited to about 120° on the broadside due to muzzle blast. The gun had an elevation range of −5° to +15°. The 9.2-inch (230 mm) shell weighed 380 pounds (172.4 kg) and was fired at a maximum muzzle velocity of 2,778 ft/s (847 m/s). This gave it a range of 15,500 yards (14,200 m) at maximum elevation. The gun's rate of fire was about three rounds per minute and the ships carried 100 rounds for each gun.

Their secondary armament of ten 50-calibre BL 6-inch Mk XI guns was arranged in single embrasures. They were mounted amidships on the main deck and were only usable in calm weather. The guns could only traverse about 120° on the broadside. They initially had a maximum elevation of +13°, but this was later increased to +20°. This gave them a range of 14,310 yards (13,090 m) at an elevation of +15° with their 100-pound (45.4 kg) shell. Each gun was provided with 150 rounds.

Twenty Vickers quick-firing (QF) 3-pounder guns were fitted for defence against torpedo boats, six on turret roofs and fourteen in the superstructure, all on pivot mounts. These guns were too small to be useful against the torpedo boats before they got within torpedo range. They fired a 47-millimetre (1.9 in) shell that weighed 3.3 pounds (1.5 kg) and was fired at a maximum muzzle velocity of 2,587 ft/s (789 m/s). This gave it a range of 7,550 yards (6,900 m) at an elevation of +20°. 250 rounds were carried for each gun.

The ships also mounted three submerged 18-inch torpedo tubes. (Note: While most sources show the ships with three torpedo tubes, the ship plans included in McBride do not show a stern torpedo room and Friedman only lists two torpedo tubes.) They carried a total of eighteen torpedoes in addition to the six 14-inch (356 mm) torpedoes that could be used by the two 45-foot (13.7 m) steam pinnaces.

=== Armour ===
The Duke of Edinburgh-class ships had a 6-inch (152 mm) waterline armour belt of Krupp cemented armour that covered 260 feet (79.2 m) of the hull amidships. It covered the side of the ship up to the upper deck, a height of 14 feet 6 inches (4.42 m) above the waterline and reached 4 feet 10 inches (1.47 m) below it. Between the central citadel and the bow, the belt armour was 4 inches (102 mm) thick and it extended to the stern with a thickness of 3 inches (76 mm). Transverse bulkheads six inches thick protected the citadel from raking fire.

The faces of the gun turrets were 7.5 inches thick with 5.5-inch (140 mm) sides and a 2-inch (51 mm) roof. The barbettes were protected by six inches of armour as were the ammunition hoists, although the armour for those thinned to three inches between the armour belt. Two-inch armour screens separated each of the six-inch guns. The thickness of the lower deck was only .75 inches (19 mm) except for a patch of 1.5-inch (38 mm) armour over the steering gear and another 2 inches (51 mm) thick over the engine cylinders. The sides of the conning tower were 10 inches (254 mm) thick.

== Modifications ==
The funnels proved to be too short in service and they were raised about 6 feet (1.8 m) four years after completion to keep the superstructure free of smoke in a following wind. In March 1916, both ships had all their six-inch guns removed, the embrasures plated over, and six of the guns were remounted on the upper deck. In May 1917, two more were added to Duke of Edinburgh on the forecastle. The ship's foremast was converted to a tripod mast to support the weight of the fire-control director probably added in 1917.

== Ships ==
Construction data
Ship	Builder	Laid down	Launched	Completed	Cost (including armament)
Duke of Edinburgh	Pembroke Dockyard	11 Feb 1903	14 Jun 1904	20 Jan 1906	£1,201,687
Black Prince	Thames Ironworks and Shipbuilding Company, Leamouth	3 Jun 1903	8 Nov 1904	17 Mar 1906	£1,193,414

== Service history ==
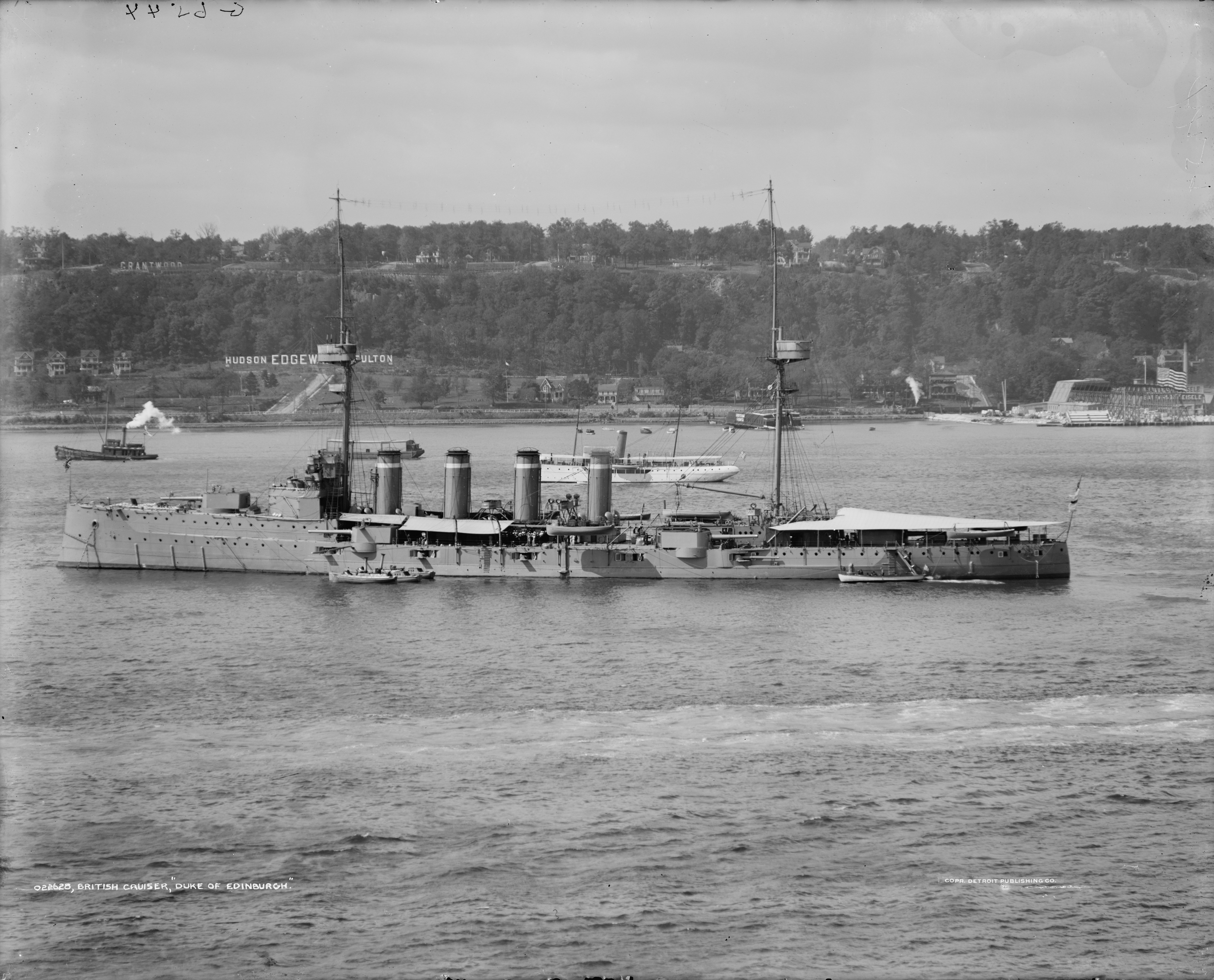
Duke of Edinburgh at anchor in 1909

Duke of Edinburgh and Black Prince served in the Channel, Atlantic and Home Fleets before World War I. They were stationed in the Mediterranean when World War I began and participated in the pursuit of the Goeben and Breslau as part of the 1st Cruiser Squadron, but was ordered not to engage. After the German ships reached Ottoman waters, the ships were sent to the Red Sea in mid-August to protect troop convoys arriving from India. While on escort duty they captured three German merchantmen.

The two sisters rejoined the 1st Cruiser Squadron in December 1914, which had transferred to the Grand Fleet and participated in the Battle of Jutland in May 1916. Black Prince became separated from the fleet when darkness fell and was sunk with all hands by German battleships later that night. Duke of Edinburgh was not damaged during the battle and was the only ship of her squadron to survive. After Jutland Duke of Edinburgh was ordered to reinforce the patrols north of the Shetland Islands against German blockade runners and commerce raiders. She was eventually transferred to the Atlantic in August 1917 for convoy escort duties. The ship was sold for scrap in 1920.

== Bibliography ==
- Campbell, John (1998). Jutland: An Analysis of the Fighting. Conway Maritime Press. ISBN 1-55821-759-2.
- Corbett, Julian (1997) [1938]. Naval Operations to the Battle of the Falklands. History of the Great War: Based on Official Documents. Vol. I (2nd ed.). Imperial War Museum and Battery Press. ISBN 0-89839-256-X.
- Friedman, Norman (2012). British Cruisers of the Victorian Era. Seaforth Publishing. ISBN 978-1-59114-068-9.
- Friedman, Norman (2011). Naval Weapons of World War One: Guns, Torpedoes, Mines and ASW Weapons of All Nations; An Illustrated Directory. Seaforth Publishing. ISBN 978-1-84832-100-7.
- McBride, Keith (1990). "The Dukes and the Warriors". Warship International. XXVII (4): 362–393. ISSN 0043-0374.
- Newbolt, Henry (1996) [1928]. Naval Operations. History of the Great War Based on Official Documents. Vol. IV. Battery Press. ISBN 0-89839-253-5.
- Newbolt, Henry (1997) [1931]. Naval Operations. History of the Great War: Based on Official Documents. Vol. V. Imperial War Museum and Battery Press. ISBN 1-870423-72-0.
- Parkes, Oscar (1990) [1966]. British Battleships, Warrior 1860 to Vanguard 1950: A History of Design, Construction, and Armament (New & rev. ed.). Naval Institute Press. ISBN 1-55750-075-4.
- Preston, Antony (1985). "Great Britain and Empire Forces". In Gardiner, Robert & Gray, Randal (eds.). Conway's All the World's Fighting Ships 1906–1921. Naval Institute Press. pp. 1–104. ISBN 0-85177-245-5.
- Roberts, John (1979). "Great Britain (including Empire Forces)". In Chesneau, Roger & Kolesnik, Eugene M. (eds.). Conway's All the World's Fighting Ships 1860–1905. Mayflower Books. pp. 1–113. ISBN 0-8317-0302-4.
- Silverstone, Paul H. (1984). Directory of the World's Capital Ships. Hippocrene Books. ISBN 0-88254-979-0.
