= Pursuit of Goeben and Breslau =

1914 naval action of the First World War

Coordinates: 43.0000°N 15.0000°E

Naval Pursuit of Goeben and Breslau
- Part of World War I
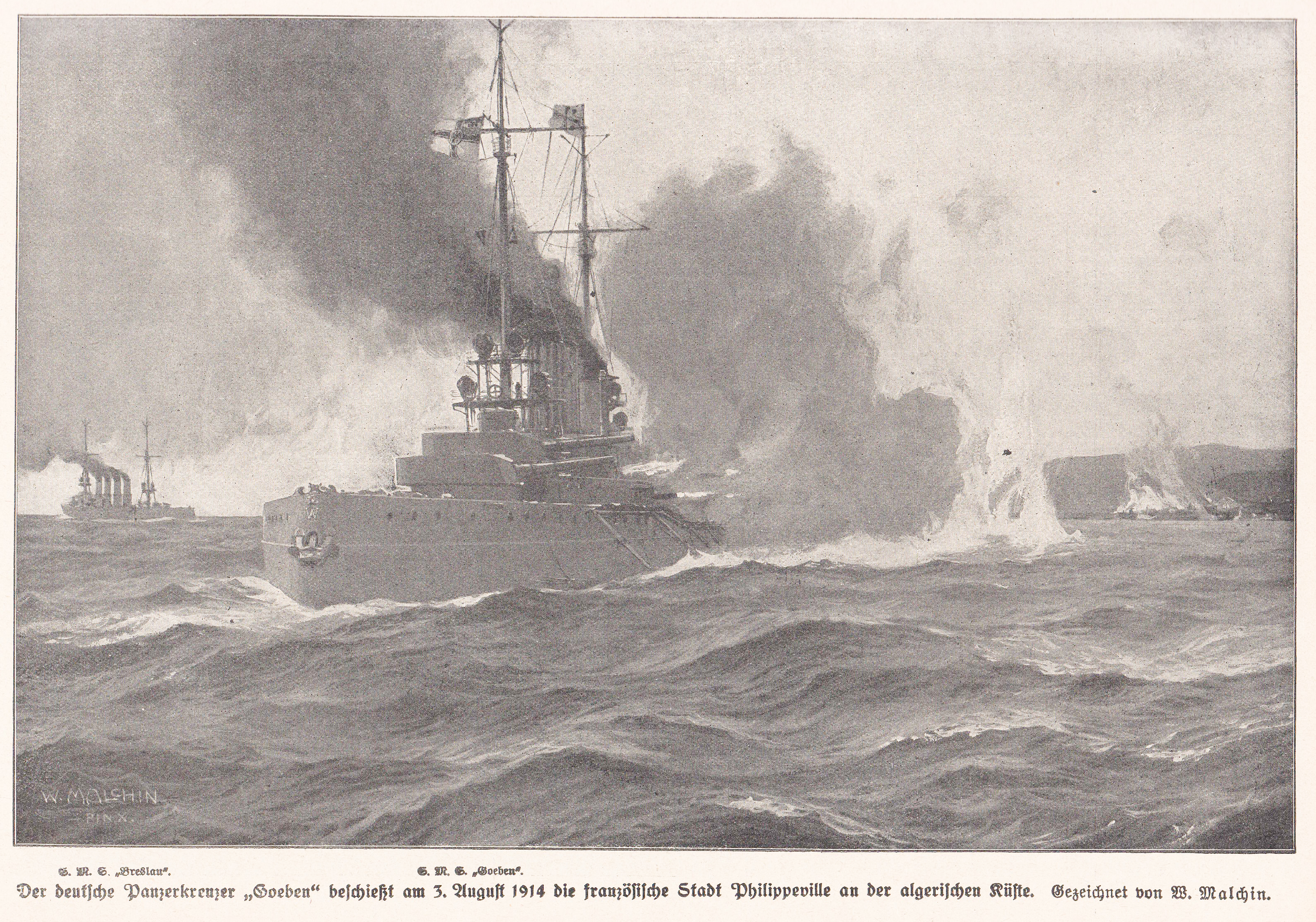
- SMS Goeben and SMS Breslau bombarding Phillipeville on the French-Algerian coast (W. Malchin, 1915)
Date	4 – 10 August 1914
Location	Mediterranean Sea
Result	German victory: Successful German retreat to Constantinople

Belligerents
United Kingdom; France	German Empire

Commanders and leaders
(United Kingdom of Great Britain and Ireland) Berkeley Milne (United Kingdom of Great Britain and Ireland) Ernest Troubridge (French Third Republic) A. B. de Lapeyrère	(German Empire) Wilhelm Souchon

Strength
3 battlecruisers 4 armoured cruisers 4 light cruisers 14 destroyers	1 battlecruiser 1 light cruiser

Casualties and losses
None	4 sailors

The pursuit of Goeben and Breslau was a naval action that occurred in the Mediterranean Sea at the outbreak of the First World War when elements of the British Mediterranean Fleet attempted to intercept the German Mittelmeerdivision consisting of the battlecruiser SMS Goeben and the light cruiser SMS Breslau. The German ships evaded the British fleet and passed through the Dardanelles to reach Constantinople, where they were eventually handed over to the Ottoman Empire. Renamed Yavuz Sultan Selim and Midilli, the former Goeben and Breslau were ordered by their German commander to attack Russian positions, in doing so bringing the Ottoman Empire into the war on the side of the Central Powers.

Though a bloodless "battle," the failure of the British pursuit had enormous political and military ramifications. In the short term it effectively ended the careers of the two British admirals who had been in charge of the pursuit. Writing several years later, Winston Churchill—who had been First Lord of the Admiralty—expressed the opinion that by forcing Turkey into the war, Goeben had brought "more slaughter, more misery, and more ruin than has ever before been borne within the compass of a ship."

== Prelude ==
Dispatched in 1912, the Mittelmeerdivision of the Kaiserliche Marine (Imperial Navy), comprising only the Goeben and Breslau, was under the command of Konteradmiral Wilhelm Souchon. In the event of war, the squadron's role was to intercept French transports bringing colonial troops from Algeria to France.

When war broke out between Austria-Hungary and Serbia on 28 July 1914, Souchon was at Pola in the Adriatic where Goeben was undergoing repairs to her boilers. Not wishing to be trapped in the Adriatic, Souchon rushed to finish as much work as possible, but then took his ships out into the Mediterranean before all repairs were completed. He reached Brindisi on 1 August, but Italian port authorities made excuses to avoid coaling the ship. This was because Italy, despite being a co-signatory to the Triple Alliance, had decided to remain neutral. Goeben was joined by Breslau at Taranto and the small squadron sailed for Messina where Souchon was able to obtain 2,000 short tons (1,800 t) of coal from German merchant ships.

Routes taken by the combatants.

Meanwhile, on 30 July Winston Churchill, then the First Lord of the Admiralty, had instructed the commander of the British Mediterranean Fleet, Admiral Sir Archibald Berkeley Milne, to cover the French transports taking the XIX Corps from North Africa across the Mediterranean to France. The British Mediterranean Fleet—based at Malta—comprised three fast, modern battlecruisers (HMS Inflexible, Indefatigable, and Indomitable), as well as four armoured cruisers, four light cruisers and a flotilla of 14 destroyers.

Milne's instructions were "to aid the French in the transportation of their African Army by covering, and if possible, bringing to action individual fast German ships, particularly Goeben, who may interfere in that action. You will be notified by telegraph when you may consult with the French Admiral. Do not at this stage be brought to action against superior forces, except in combination with the French, as part of a general battle. The speed of your squadrons is sufficient to enable you to choose your moment. We shall hope to reinforce the Mediterranean, and you must husband your forces at the outset." Churchill's orders did not explicitly state what he meant by "superior forces." He later claimed that he was referring to "the Austrian Fleet against whose battleships it was not desirable that our three battle-cruisers should be engaged without battleship support."

Milne assembled his force at Malta on 1 August. On 2 August, he received instructions to shadow Goeben with two battlecruisers while maintaining a watch on the Adriatic, ready for a sortie by the Austrians. Indomitable, Indefatigable, five cruisers and eight destroyers commanded by Rear Admiral Ernest Troubridge were sent to cover the Adriatic. Goeben had already departed but was sighted that same day at Taranto by the British Consul, who informed London. Fearing the German ships might be trying to escape to the Atlantic, the Admiralty ordered that Indomitable and Indefatigable be sent west towards Gibraltar. Milne's other task of protecting French ships was complicated by the lack of any direct communications with the French navy, which had meanwhile postponed the sailing of the troop ships. The light cruiser HMS Chatham was sent to search the Straits of Messina for Goeben. However, by this time, on the morning of 3 August, Souchon had departed from Messina, heading west.

== First contact ==
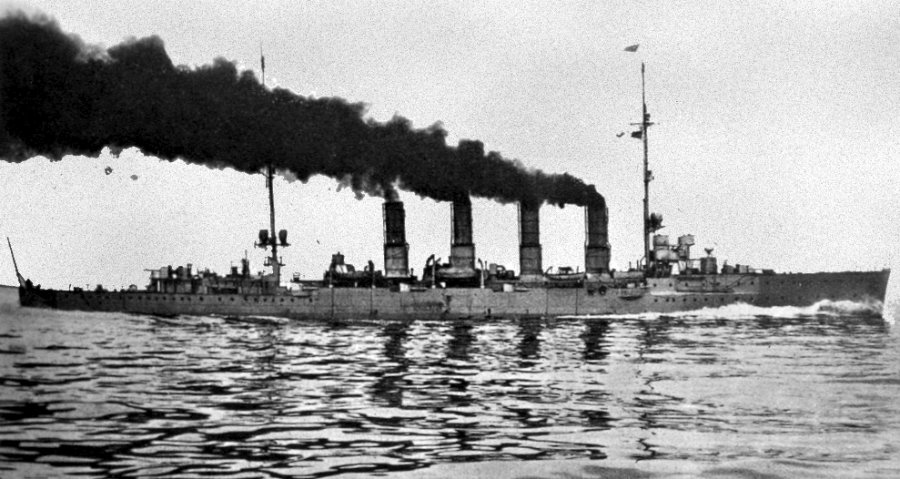
The German light cruiser SMS Breslau.

Without specific orders, Souchon had decided to position his ships off the coast of Africa, ready to engage when hostilities commenced in order to attack French transport ships, which were headed toward Toulon. He planned to bombard the embarkation ports of Bône and Philippeville in French Algeria. Goeben was heading for Philippeville, while Breslau was detached to deal with Bône. At 18:00 on 3 August, while still sailing west, he received word that Germany had declared war on France. Then, early on 4 August, Souchon received orders from Admiral Alfred von Tirpitz reading: "Alliance with government of CUP concluded 3 August. Proceed at once to Constantinople." So close to his targets, Souchon ignored the order and pushed on, flying the Russian flag as he approached, in order to evade detection. He carried out a shore bombardment at dawn before breaking off and heading back to Messina for more coal.

Under a pre-war agreement with the United Kingdom, France was able to concentrate her entire fleet in the Mediterranean, leaving the Royal Navy to ensure the security of France's Atlantic coast. Three squadrons of the French fleet were covering the transports. However, assuming that Goeben would continue west to Gibraltar, the French commander, Admiral de Lapeyrère, sent the "Groupe A" of his fleet to the west in order to make contact, but Souchon was heading east and so was able to slip away.

At 09:30 on 4 August Souchon made contact with the two British battlecruisers, Indomitable and Indefatigable, which passed the German ships in the opposite direction. Neither force engaged as, unlike France, the UK had not yet declared war with Germany (the declaration would not be made until later that day, following the start of the German invasion of neutral Belgium). The British started shadowing Goeben and Breslau but were quickly outpaced by the Germans. Milne reported the contact and position, but neglected to inform the Admiralty that the German ships were heading east. Churchill therefore, still expecting them to threaten the French transports, authorised Milne to engage the German ships if they attacked. However, a meeting of the British Cabinet decided that hostilities could not start before a declaration of war, and at 14:00 Churchill was obliged to cancel his attack order.

== Pursuit ==
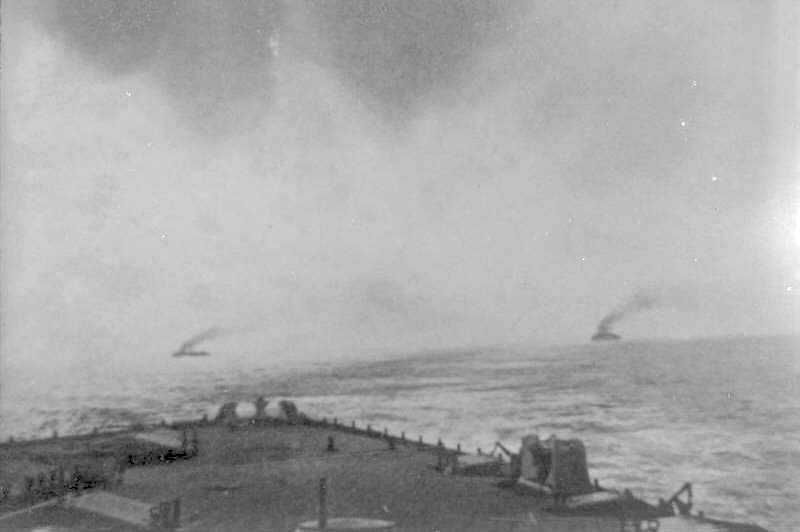
British ships seen following the German ships

The rated speed of Goeben was 27 knots (50 km/h; 31 mph), but her damaged boilers meant she could only manage 24 knots (44 km/h; 28 mph), and this was only achieved by working men and machinery to the limit; four stokers were killed by scalding steam. Fortunately for Souchon, both British battlecruisers were also suffering from problems with their boilers and were unable to keep Goeben′s pace. The light cruiser HMS Dublin maintained contact, while Indomitable and Indefatigable fell behind. In fog and fading light, Dublin lost contact off Cape San Vito on the north coast of Sicily at 19:37. Goeben and Breslau returned to Messina the following morning, by which time Britain and Germany were at war.

The Admiralty ordered Milne to respect Italian neutrality and stay outside a 6-nautical-mile (11 km; 6.9 mi) limit from the Italian coast—which precluded entrance into the passage of the Straits of Messina. Consequently, Milne posted guards on the exits from the Straits. Still expecting Souchon to head for the transports and the Atlantic, he placed two battlecruisers—Inflexible and Indefatigable—to cover the northern exit (which gave access to the western Mediterranean), while the southern exit of the Straits was covered by a single light cruiser, HMS Gloucester. Milne sent Indomitable west to coal at Bizerte, instead of south to Malta.

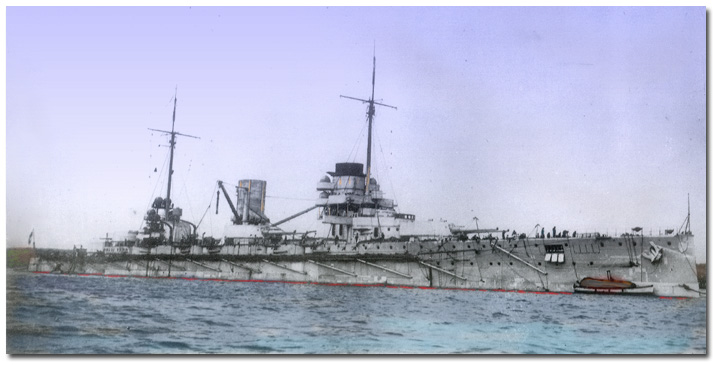
SMS Goeben

For Souchon, Messina was no haven. The Italian authorities insisted that he depart within 24 hours and delayed supplying coal. Provisioning his ships required ripping up the decks of German merchant steamers in harbour and manually shovelling their coal into his bunkers. By the evening of 6 August, despite the help of 400 volunteers from the merchantmen, he had only taken on 1,500 short tons (1,400 t) which was insufficient to reach Constantinople. Further messages from Tirpitz made his predicament even more dire. He was informed that Austria would provide no naval aid in the Mediterranean and that the Ottoman Empire was still neutral and therefore he should no longer make for Constantinople. Faced with the alternative of seeking refuge at Pola, and probably remaining trapped for the rest of the war, Souchon chose to head for Constantinople anyway, his purpose being "to force the Ottoman Empire, even against their will, to spread the war to the Black Sea against their ancient enemy, Russia."

Milne was instructed on 5 August to continue watching the Adriatic for signs of the Austrian fleet and to prevent the German ships joining them. He chose to keep his battlecruisers in the west, dispatching Dublin to join Troubridge's cruiser squadron in the Adriatic, which he believed would be able to intercept Goeben and Breslau. Troubridge was instructed "not to get seriously engaged with superior forces," once again intended as a warning against engaging the Austrian fleet. When Goeben and Breslau emerged into the eastern Mediterranean on 6 August, they were met by Gloucester, which, being outgunned, began to shadow the German ships.

Troubridge's squadron consisted of the armoured cruisers HMS Defence, Black Prince, Warrior, Duke of Edinburgh and eight destroyers armed with torpedoes. The cruisers had 9.2 in (230 mm) guns versus the 11 in (280 mm) guns of Goeben and had armour a maximum of 6 in (15 cm) thick compared to the battlecruiser's 11 in (28 cm) armour belt. This meant that Troubridge's squadron was not only outranged and vulnerable to Goeben′s powerful guns, but it was unlikely that his cruiser's guns could seriously damage the German ship at all, even at short range. In addition, the British ships were several knots slower than Goeben, despite her damaged boilers, meaning that she could dictate the range of the battle if she spotted the British squadron in advance. Consequently, Troubridge considered his only chance was to locate and engage Goeben in favourable light, at dawn, with Goeben east of his ships, and ideally launch a torpedo attack with his destroyers; however, at least five of the destroyers did not have enough coal to keep up with the cruisers steaming at full speed. By 04:00 on 7 August, Troubridge realised he would not be able to intercept the German ships before daylight and after some deliberation he signalled Milne with his intentions to break off the chase, mindful of Churchill's ambiguous order to avoid engaging a "superior force." No reply was received until 10:00, by which time he had withdrawn to Zakynthos to refuel.

== Escape ==
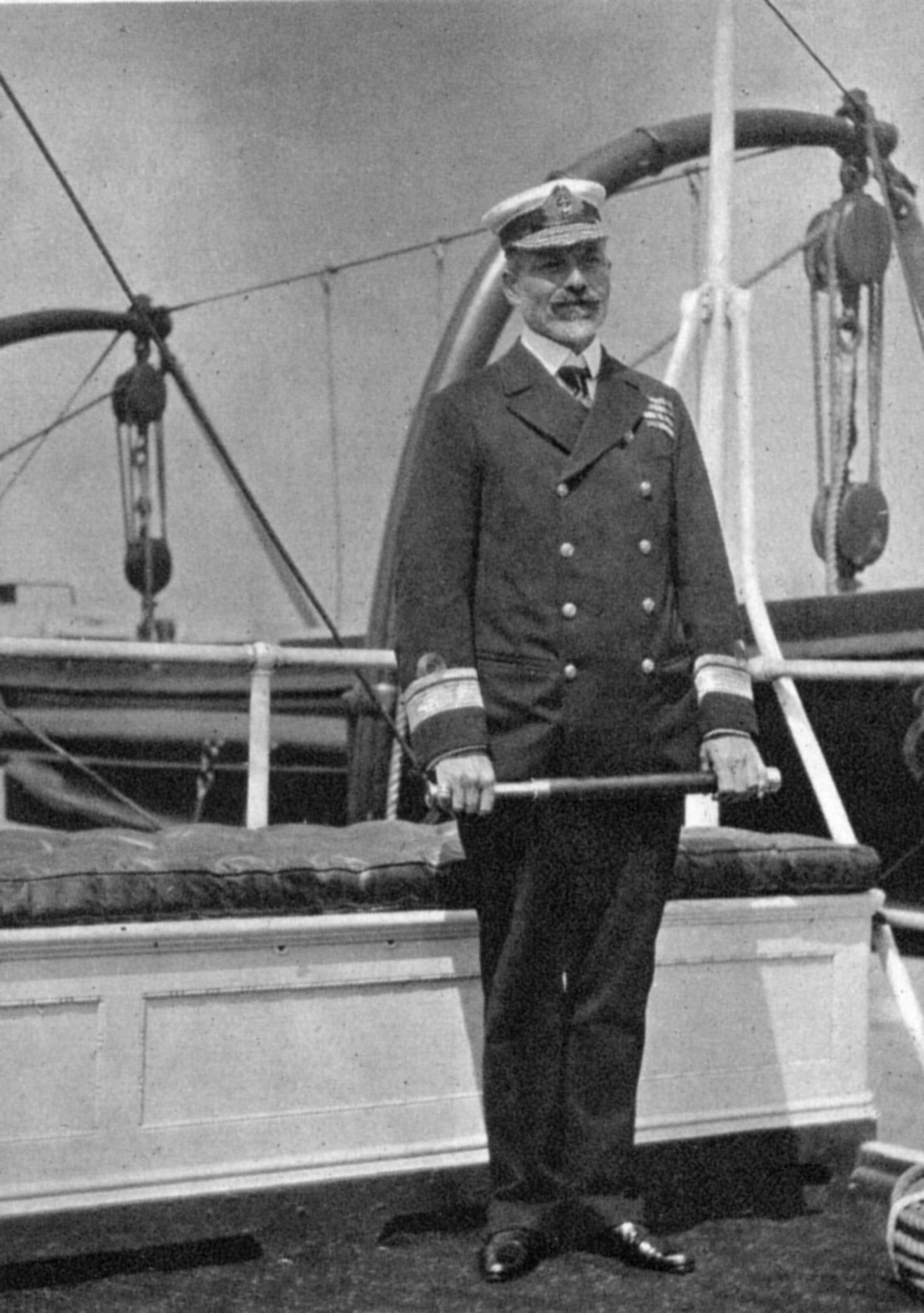
Admiral Milne

Milne ordered Gloucester to disengage, still expecting Souchon to turn west, but it was apparent to Gloucester′s captain that Goeben was fleeing. Breslau attempted to harass Gloucester into breaking off—Souchon had a collier waiting off the coast of Greece and needed to shake his pursuer before he could rendezvous. Gloucester finally engaged Breslau, hoping this would compel Goeben to drop back and protect the light cruiser. According to Souchon, Breslau was hit, but no damage was done. The action then broke off without further hits being scored. Finally, Milne ordered Gloucester to cease pursuit at Cape Matapan.

Shortly after midnight on 8 August Milne took his three battlecruisers and the light cruiser HMS Weymouth east. At 14:00 he received an incorrect signal from the Admiralty stating that Britain was at war with Austria; war would not be declared until 12 August and the order was countermanded four hours later, but Milne chose to guard the Adriatic rather than seek Goeben. Finally, on 9 August, Milne was given clear orders to "chase Goeben which had passed Cape Matapan on the 7th steering north-east." Milne still did not believe that Souchon was heading for the Dardanelles, and so he resolved to guard the exit from the Aegean, unaware that Goeben did not intend to come out.

Souchon had replenished his coal off the Aegean island of Donoussa on 9 August, and the German warships resumed their voyage to Constantinople. At 17:00 on 10 August, he reached the Dardanelles and awaited permission to pass through. Germany had for some time been courting the Committee of Union and Progress of the imperial government, and it now used its influence to pressure the Turkish Minister of War, Enver Pasha, into granting the ships passage, an act that would outrage Russia, which relied on the Dardanelles as its main all-season shipping route. In addition, the Germans managed to persuade Enver to order any pursuing British ships to be fired on. By the time Souchon received permission to enter the straits, his lookouts could see smoke on the horizon from approaching British ships.

Turkey was still a neutral country bound by treaty to prevent German warships from passing the straits. To get around this difficulty it was agreed that the ships should become part of the Turkish navy. On 16 August, having reached Constantinople, Goeben and Breslau were transferred to the Turkish Navy in a small ceremony, becoming respectively Yavuz Sultan Selim and Midilli, though they retained their German crews with Souchon still in command. The initial reaction in Britain was one of satisfaction, that a threat had been removed from the Mediterranean. On 23 September, Souchon was appointed commander-in-chief of the Ottoman Navy.

== Consequences ==
In August, Germany—still expecting a swift victory—was content for the Ottoman Empire to remain neutral. The mere presence of a powerful warship like Goeben in the Sea of Marmara would be enough to occupy a British naval squadron guarding the Dardanelles. However, following German reverses at the First Battle of the Marne in September, and with Russian successes against Austria-Hungary, Germany began to regard the Ottoman Empire as a useful ally. Tensions began to escalate when the Ottoman Empire closed the Dardanelles to all shipping on 27 September, blocking Russia's exit from the Black Sea—that accounted for over 90 percent of Russia's import and export traffic.

Germany's gift of the two modern warships had an enormous positive impact on the Turkish population. At the outbreak of the war, Churchill had caused outrage when he "requisitioned" two almost completed Ottoman battleships in British shipyards, Sultan Osman I and Reshadieh, which had been financed by public subscription at a cost of £6,000,000. The Ottomans were offered compensation of £1,000 per day for so long as the war might last, provided she remained neutral. (These ships were commissioned into the Royal Navy as HMS Agincourt and HMS Erin respectively.) The Ottoman Empire had been neutral, though the navy had been pro-British (having purchased 40 warships from British shipyards) while the army was in favour of Germany, so the two incidents helped resolve the deadlock and the Ottoman Empire would join the Central Powers.

=== Ottoman engagement ===
Continued diplomacy from France and Russia attempted to keep the Ottoman Empire out of the war, but Germany was agitating for a commitment. In the aftermath of Souchon's daring dash to Constantinople, on 15 August 1914 the Ottomans canceled their maritime agreement with Britain and the Royal Navy mission under Admiral Limpus left by 15 September.

Finally, on 29 October, the point of no return was reached when Admiral Souchon took Goeben, Breslau and a squadron of Turkish warships and launched the Black Sea Raid against the Russian ports of Novorossiysk, Feodosia, Odessa, and Sevastopol. The ensuing political crises brought the Ottoman Empire into the war.

=== Royal Navy ===
While the consequences of the Royal Navy's failure to intercept Goeben and Breslau had not been immediately apparent, the humiliation of the "defeat" resulted in Admirals de Lapeyrère, Milne and Troubridge being censured. Milne was recalled from the Mediterranean and did not hold another command until retirement at his own request in 1919, his planned assumption of the Nore command having been cancelled in 1916 due to "other exigencies." The Admiralty repeatedly stated that Milne had been exonerated of all blame. For his failure to engage Goeben with his cruisers, Troubridge was court-martialled in November on the charge that "he did forbear to chase His Imperial German Majesty's ship Goeben, being an enemy then flying." The charge was not proved on the grounds that he was under orders not to engage a "superior force." However, he was never given another sea-going command but did valuable service, co-operating with the Serbs on the Balkan and being given command of a force on the Danube in 1915 against the Austro-Hungarians. He eventually retired as a full Admiral.

=== Long-term consequences ===
Although a relatively minor 'action' and perhaps not a widely known historical event, the escape of Goeben to Constantinople and its eventual annexation to Turkey ultimately precipitated some of the most dramatic naval chases of the 20th century. It also assisted in helping to shape the eventual splitting up of the Ottoman Empire into the many states we know today.

General Ludendorff stated in his memoirs that he believed the entry of the Ottomans into the war allowed the outnumbered Central Powers to fight on for two years longer than they would have been able on their own, a view shared by historian Ian F.W. Beckett.

The war was extended to the Middle East with main fronts of Gallipoli, the Sinai and Palestine, Mesopotamia, and the Caucasus. The course of the war in the Balkans was also influenced by the entry of the Ottoman Empire on the side of the Central Powers. Had the war ended in 1916, some of the bloodiest engagements, such as the Battle of the Somme, would have been avoided. The United States might not have been drawn from the policy of isolation to intervene in a foreign war.

The Gallipoli campaign is considered to be the beginning of Australian and New Zealand national consciousness, an event which would not have taken place without the Ottoman entry into the war. The anniversary of the landings, 25 April, is known as ANZAC Day, the most significant commemoration of military casualties and veterans in the two countries, surpassing Remembrance Day (Armistice Day).

In allying with the Central Powers, the Ottoman Empire shared their fate in ultimate defeat. This gave the allies the opportunity to carve up the collapsed Empire to suit their political whims. Many new nations were created including Syria, Lebanon, Saudi Arabia and Iraq.

== Bibliography ==
- Churchill, Winston S. (1923–1927). The World Crisis. Thornton Butterworth Ltd.
- Dennis, Peter; Grey, Jeffrey; Morris, Ewan; Prior, Robin; Bou, Jean (2008). The Oxford Companion to Australian Military History (2nd ed.). Melbourne: Oxford University Press. ISBN 978-0-19-551784-2.
- Fromkin, David (1989). A Peace to End All Peace: Creating the Modern Middle East 1914–1922. Owl Books. ISBN 0-8050-0857-8.
- Keegan, John (2003). Intelligence in War. Hutchinson. ISBN 0-09-180229-6.
- Lewis, Wendy; Balderstone, Simon; Bowan, John (2006). Events That Shaped Australia. Frenchs Forest, NSW: New Holland. ISBN 978-1-74110-492-9.
- Lumby, Esmond Walter Rawson, ed. (1970). Policy and operations in the Mediterranean, 1912–14. London: Navy Records Society. ISBN 0-85354-004-7.
- Massie, Robert (2004). Castles of Steel: Britain, Germany and the winning of the Great War. Random House. ISBN 0-224-04092-8.
- McGibbon, Ian, ed. (2000). The Oxford Companion to New Zealand Military History. Auckland, NZ: Oxford University Press. ISBN 978-0-19-558376-2.
- McLaughlin, Redmond (1974). The escape of the Goeben. Scribners.
- Moorehead, Alan (1956). Gallipoli. Wordsworth Editions. ISBN 1-85326-675-2.
- Tuchman, Barbara (1962). The Guns of August. Constable. ISBN 0-333-69880-0.
- Van Der Vat, Dan (2001). The Ship that Changed the World (Revised ed.). Birlinn. ISBN 978-1-84158-062-3.

== See also ==
Barbara Tuchman - As a very young child, the author of The Guns of August was on an Italian passenger ship that witnessed the Gloucester's action against Goeben and Breslau.
