= HMS Gloucester (1909) =

Town-class light cruiser

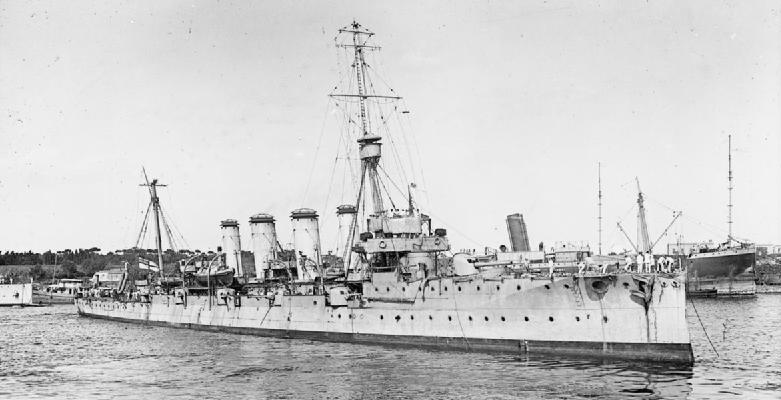
- Gloucester at anchor, 1918

History

United Kingdom
- Name: Gloucester
- Namesake: Gloucester
- Builder: William Beardmore and Company, Dalmuir
- Laid down: 15 April 1909
- Launched: 28 October 1909
- Commissioned: October 1910
- Out of service: March 1920
- Fate: Sold for scrap, 9 May 1921

General characteristics (as built)
- Class & type: Town-class light cruiser
- Displacement: 4,800 long tons (4,900 t)
- Length: 430 ft (131.1 m) p/p; 453 ft (138.1 m) o/a
- Beam: 47 ft (14.3 m)
- Draught: 15 ft 3 in (4.65 m) (mean)
- Installed power: 12 × Yarrow boilers; 22,000 shp (16,000 kW)
- Propulsion: 4 × shafts; 2 × steam turbines
- Speed: 25 kn (46 km/h; 29 mph)
- Range: 5,830 nmi (10,800 km; 6,710 mi) at 10 knots (19 km/h; 12 mph)
- Complement: 480
- Armament: 2 × single 6 in (152 mm) guns; 10 × single 4 in (102 mm) guns; 4 × 3 pdr (47 mm (1.9 in)) guns; 2 × 18 in (457 mm) torpedo tubes
- Armour: Deck: .75–2 in (19–51 mm); Conning tower: 6 in (150 mm)

HMS Gloucester was a Town-class light cruiser built for the Royal Navy in the first decade of the 20th century. The ship was initially assigned to the Home Fleet upon commissioning in 1910 and was transferred to the Mediterranean Fleet in 1913. She was involved in the hunt for the German ships Goeben and Breslau after World War I began in August 1914. Gloucester was detailed several times during the war to search for German commerce raiders, but her only success was the capture of one supply ship in early 1915. She played a minor role in the Battle of Jutland in mid-1916 and then spent most of the rest of the war in the Adriatic Sea. The ship was placed in reserve in 1919 and was sold for scrap in 1921.

== Design and description ==
The Bristol sub-class (Note: Sometimes known as the Glasgow class.) were rated as second-class cruisers suitable for a variety of roles including both trade protection and duties with the fleet. They were 453 feet (138.1 m) long overall, with a beam of 47 feet (14.3 m) and a draught of 15 feet 6 inches (4.7 m). Displacement was 4,800 long tons (4,900 t) normal and 5,300 long tons (5,400 t) at full load. Twelve Yarrow boilers fed Gloucester's Parsons steam turbines, driving four propeller shafts, that were rated at 22,000 shaft horsepower (16,000 kW) for a design speed of 25 knots (46 km/h; 29 mph). The ship reached 25.85 knots (47.87 km/h; 29.75 mph) during her sea trials from 22,406 shp (16,708 kW). The boilers used both fuel oil and coal, with 1,353 long tons (1,375 t) of coal and 256 long tons (260 t) tons of oil carried, which gave a range of 5,830 nautical miles (10,800 km; 6,710 mi) at 10 knots (19 km/h; 12 mph). The ship had a crew of 480 officers and ratings.

The main armament of the Bristol class was two BL 6-inch (152 mm) Mk XI guns that were mounted on the centreline fore and aft of the superstructure and ten BL 4-inch Mk VII guns in waist mountings. All these guns were fitted with gun shields. Four Vickers 3-pounder (47 mm) saluting guns were fitted, while two submerged 18-inch (450 mm) torpedo tubes were fitted. This armament was considered rather too light for ships of this size by the Royal Navy, while the waist guns were subject to immersion in a high sea, making them difficult to work.

The Bristols were considered protected cruisers, with an armoured deck providing protection for the ships' vitals. The armoured deck was 2 inches (51 mm) thick over the magazines and machinery, 1 inch (25 mm) over the steering gear and 3/4 inch (19 mm) elsewhere. The conning tower was protected by 6 inches (150 mm) of armour, with the gun shields having 3 inches (76 mm) armour, as did the ammunition hoists. As the protective deck was at the waterline, the ships were given a large metacentric height so that they would remain stable in the event of flooding above the armoured deck. This, however, resulted in the ships rolling badly making them poor gun platforms. One problem with the armour of the Bristols, which was shared with the other Town-class ships, was the sizable gap between the bottom of the gun shields and the deck, which allowed shell splinters to pass through the gap and made the guns' crews vulnerable to leg injuries in combat.

== Construction and career ==
Gloucester was the eighth ship in the Royal Navy to be named after the eponymous port. The ship was laid down on 15 April 1909 by William Beardmore and Company at their Dalmuir shipyard and launched on 28 October. On being commissioned in October 1910, the ship was assigned to the 1st Battle Squadron of the Home Fleet. In January 1913, Gloucester was transferred to the 2nd Light Cruiser Squadron (LCS) in the Mediterranean.

=== Pursuit of Goeben and Breslau ===
As tensions rose with Germany in the first few days of August 1914, before Britain declared war, Gloucester was deployed at the mouth of the Adriatic Sea, together with the bulk of the Mediterranean Fleet, by its commander, Admiral Sir Archibald Berkeley Milne. Their task was to prevent the German battlecruiser Goeben and the light cruiser Breslau from linking up with the Austro-Hungarian Fleet. The battlecruisers Indefatigable and Indomitable were withdrawn from this force on 2 August and found the German ships on the morning of 4 August headed east after a cursory bombardment of the French Algerian port of Philippeville. But Britain and Germany were not yet at war so Milne turned to shadow the Germans as they headed back to Messina, Sicily, to recoal. All three battlecruisers had problems with their boilers, but Goeben and Breslau were able to break contact and reached Messina by the morning of the 5th. By this time war had been declared, after the German invasion of Belgium, but an Admiralty order to respect Italian neutrality and stay outside a six-mile (10 km) limit from the Italian coast precluded entrance into the passage of the Strait of Messina where they could observe the port directly. Therefore, Milne stationed the battlecruisers Inflexible and Indefatigable at the northwestern exit of the Strait of Messina as he still expected the Germans to break out to the west where they could attack French troop transports. He positioned Gloucester at the southeastern exit and sent Indomitable to recoal at Bizerte, French Tunisia, where she was better positioned to react to a German sortie into the Western Mediterranean.

The Germans sortied from Messina on 6 August and headed east, towards Constantinople, trailed by Gloucester which was radioing the German movements to Milne. Rear Admiral Wilhelm Souchon ordered Breslau to turn about and pretend to lay mines in an effort to scare off Gloucester. Captain Howard Kelly decided to attack the German ship in an effort to force Goeben to turn around to support her consort as the British ship was more heavily armed than Breslau. Kelly opened fire at a range of 11,500 yards (10,500 m) with his forward six-inch gun at 13:35 on the 7th and then increased speed when the German ship replied with her 105-millimetre (4.1 in) guns. When he had closed the range to 10,000 yards (9,100 m), he turned to unmask Gloucester's broadside. This caused Souchon to turn and open fire on the British cruiser and Kelly disengaged, having accomplished his goal. Gloucester fired 18 six- and 14 four-inch shells during the brief engagement, but only hit Breslau once to little effect. She was not hit in return. Kelly was forced to break off his pursuit at 16:40 as Milne had strictly forbidden him to pass Cape Matapan, Greece, and his coal was running low.

Captain Kelly was appointed a Companion of the Order of the Bath. According to the citation, “The report of the ‘Gloucester’ shows that the ‘Goeben’ could have caught and sunk her at any time had she dared to turn upon her. The ‘Goeben’ was apparently deterred by the ‘Gloucester's’ boldness, which gave the impression of support close at hand. The combination of audacity with restraint, unwavering attention to the principal military object, namely, holding on to the ‘Goeben’ without tempting her too much, and strict conformity to orders, constitute a naval episode which is justly regarded as a model.”

After the German ships safely reached Turkey, Gloucester was assigned to the squadron blockading the Dardanelles, the strait between the Aegean Sea and the Black Sea for the next several months. In November the ship was ordered into the Indian Ocean to search for German commerce raiders, although she was recalled shortly afterwards to rejoin the 2nd LCS of the Grand Fleet in home waters. Gloucester was detached in late February 1915 to search for the German armed merchant cruiser SS Kronprinz Wilhelm off the west coast of Africa, departing Scapa Flow on 27 February. By 18 March, she had been reassigned to the 3rd Light Cruiser Squadron of the Battle Cruiser Fleet. On 28 March, Gloucester captured the German raider's supply ship, SS Macedonia, in the Central Atlantic and Kronprinz Wilhelm was forced to intern herself a few weeks later for lack of supplies. Gloucester remained on patrol through the end of April, although it is likely that she rejoined her squadron in May. It has been long rumoured that she shelled Galway, Ireland, during the Easter Rising in April 1916, but she was probably confused with the sloop Laburnum, which did shell the outskirts of Galway a day before Gloucester arrived in Galway Bay landing 100 Royal Marines.

=== Battle of Jutland ===
Maps showing the manoeuvres of the British (blue) and German (red) fleets on 31 May – 1 June 1916

Almost a year later, Gloucester participated in the Battle of Jutland on 31 May–1 June 1916. As the battle began, the 3rd LCS was screening Vice-Admiral David Beatty's battlecruisers as they searched for the German fleet and moved to support the 1st Light Cruiser Squadron after they had spotted the German ships. This put them out of position when Beatty turned south to pursue the German battlecruisers. After he turned north on encountering the main body of the German High Seas Fleet, the 3rd LCS were the first to encounter the screen of the Grand Fleet at 17:33. As Beatty turned east to rendezvous with them, Gloucester was unable to reach the head of the Grand Fleet's line and was forced to steer for the unengaged side to avoid fouling the range with her funnel smoke. The cruiser briefly engaged the disabled light cruiser SMS Wiesbaden about 18:15. By 18:40, the squadron was in position to escort the 3rd Battlecruiser Squadron of the Grand Fleet.

By 20:10, Beatty's ships were in front of the Grand Fleet and the 3rd LCS was screening them when the flagship, Falmouth, spotted five cruisers of the 4th Scouting Group and the squadron closed to engage at full speed. The British ships were not spotted in return until 20:17 and Falmouth opened fire a minute later at a range of 9,600 yards (8,800 m). By 20:38, the British lost sight of the Germans and turned away to assume their position at the head of Beatty's battlecruisers. The cruiser fired a total of 37 shells and was not damaged during the battle.

=== Subsequent operations ===
After the battle, the ship was reassigned to the 2nd Battle Squadron, and had been transferred to the 8th Light Cruiser Squadron in the Adriatic by December. Gloucester was detached to the Indian Ocean in March 1917 to search for the German commerce raider SMS Wolf, but was recalled on 23 May. She remained in the Adriatic until the end of the war in November 1918. The ship was placed in reserve the following April, listed for disposal in March 1920 and was sold for scrap on 9 May 1921 to Thos. W. Ward, of Portishead and Briton Ferry.

== Bibliography ==
- Brown, David K. (2010). The Grand Fleet: Warship Design and Development 1906–1922. Seaforth Publishing. ISBN 978-1-84832-085-7.
- Campbell, N. J. M. (1986). Jutland: An Analysis of the Fighting. Naval Institute Press. ISBN 0-87021-324-5.
- Colledge, J. J.; Warlow, Ben (2006) [1969]. Ships of the Royal Navy: The Complete Record of All Fighting Ships of the Royal Navy from the 15th Century to the Present (3rd Rev ed.). London: Chatham Publishing. ISBN 978-1-86176-281-8. OCLC 67375475.
- Corbett, Julian. Naval Operations to the Battle of the Falklands. History of the Great War: Based on Official Documents. Vol. I (2nd ed.). Imperial War Museum and Battery Press. ISBN 0-89839-256-X.
- Corbett, Julian (1997) [1929]. Naval Operations. History of the Great War: Based on Official Documents. Vol. II (Second ed.). Imperial War Museum in association with the Battery Press. ISBN 1-870423-74-7.
- Friedman, Norman (2010). British Cruisers: Two World Wars and After. Naval Institute Press. ISBN 978-1-59114-078-8.
- Hardiman, Frank. "Statement by Witness" (PDF). Bureau of Military Affairs 1913–21. Archived from the original (PDF) on 17 December 2013.
- "HMS GLOUCESTER – February to April 1915, British Home Waters and Central Atlantic". Royal Navy Log Books of the World War 1 Era. Naval-History.net.
- Lyon, David (1977). "The First Town Class 1908–31: Part 1". Warship. 1 (1). Conway Maritime Press: 48–58. ISBN 0-85177-132-7.
- Lyon, David (1977). "The First Town Class 1908–31: Part 2". Warship. 1 (2). Conway Maritime Press: 54–61. ISBN 0-85177-132-7.
- Lyon, David (1977). "The First Town Class 1908–31: Part 3". Warship. 1 (3). Conway Maritime Press: 46–51. ISBN 0-85177-132-7.
- Massie, Robert (2004). Castles of Steel: Britain, Germany and the winning of the Great War. Random House. ISBN 0-224-04092-8.
- Newbolt, Henry (1996) [1931]. Naval Operations. History of the Great War Based on Official Documents. Vol. V. Battery Press. ISBN 0-89839-255-1.
- Preston, Antony (1985). "Great Britain and Empire Forces". In Gray, Randal (ed.). Conway's All the World's Fighting Ships 1906–1921. Naval Institute Press. pp. 1–104. ISBN 0-85177-245-5.
