= HMS Falmouth (1910) =

Town-class light cruiser of the Royal Navy

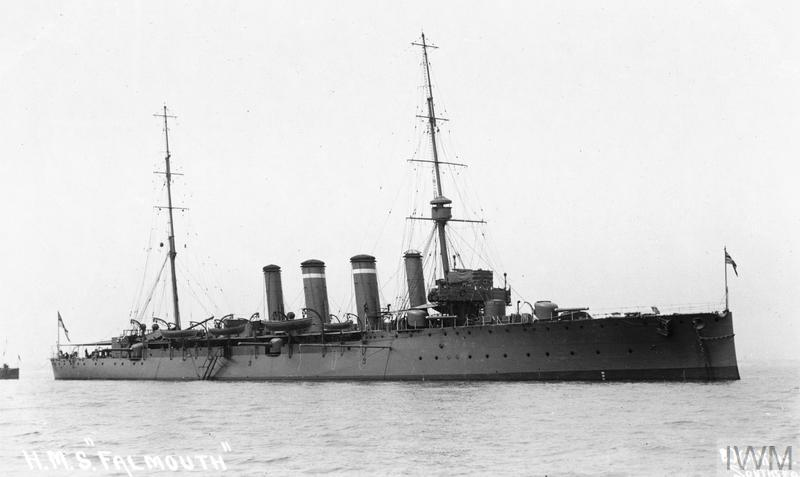
- Falmouth at anchor, 1914

History

United Kingdom
- Name: Falmouth
- Namesake: Falmouth, Cornwall
- Builder: William Beardmore and Company, Dalmuir
- Laid down: 21 February 1910
- Launched: 20 September 1910
- Commissioned: September 1911
- Fate: Sunk, 20 August 1916

General characteristics (as built)
- Class & type: Town-class light cruiser
- Displacement: 5,275 long tons (5,360 t)
- Length: 430 ft (131.1 m) p/p; 453 ft (138.1 m) o/a
- Beam: 47 ft 6 in (14.5 m)
- Draught: 15 ft 6 in (4.72 m) (mean)
- Installed power: 12 × Yarrow boilers; 22,000 shp (16,000 kW)
- Propulsion: 4 × shafts; 2 × Parsons steam turbines
- Speed: 25 knots (46 km/h; 29 mph)
- Range: 5,610 nmi (10,390 km; 6,460 mi) at 10 knots (19 km/h; 12 mph)
- Complement: 475
- Armament: 8 × single 6 in (152 mm) guns; 4 × single 3 pdr (47 mm (1.9 in)) guns; 2 × 21 in (533 mm) torpedo tubes
- Armour: Deck: .75–2 in (19–51 mm); Conning tower: 4 in (102 mm)

HMS Falmouth was a Town-class light cruiser built for the Royal Navy during the 1910s. She was one of four ships of the Weymouth sub-class. The ship was initially assigned to the Atlantic Fleet upon completion in 1911, but was reduced to reserve in mid-1913. When the First World War began in 1914, Falmouth was transferred to the 1st Light Cruiser Squadron (LCS) of the Grand Fleet and then the 3rd Light Cruiser Squadron at the end of the year. The ship participated in most of the early fleet actions, including the Battles of Heligoland Bight, Dogger Bank, and Jutland, but was only seriously engaged in the latter. She was torpedoed and sunk off Flamborough Head, Yorkshire by German submarines during the action of 19 August 1916.

== Design and description ==
The Weymouth sub-class were slightly larger and improved versions of the preceding Bristol sub-class with a more powerful armament. They were 453 feet (138.1 m) long overall, with a beam of 47 feet 6 inches (14.5 m) and a draught of 15 feet 6 inches (4.7 m). Displacement was 5,275 long tons (5,360 t) normal and 5,800 long tons (5,900 t) at full load. Twelve Yarrow boilers fed Falmouth's Parsons steam turbines, driving two propeller shafts, that were rated at 22,000 shaft horsepower (16,000 kW) for a design speed of 25 knots (46 km/h; 29 mph). The ship reached 26.62 knots (49.30 km/h; 30.63 mph) during her sea trials from 27,900 shp (20,800 kW). The boilers used both fuel oil and coal, with 1,290 long tons (1,311 t) of coal and 269 long tons (273 t) tons of oil carried, which gave a range of 5,610 nautical miles (10,390 km; 6,460 mi) at 10 knots (19 km/h; 12 mph).

The Weymouths replaced the ten 4-inch (102 mm) guns of the Bristol sub-class with an additional six BL 6-inch (152 mm) Mk XI guns. Two of these guns were mounted on the centreline fore and aft of the superstructure and two more were mounted on the forecastle deck abreast the bridge. The remaining four guns were positioned on the upper deck in waist mountings. All these guns were fitted with gun shields. Four Vickers 3-pounder (47 mm) saluting guns were also fitted. Their armament was completed by two submerged 21-inch (533 mm) torpedo tubes.

The Weymouth-class ships were considered protected cruisers, with an armoured deck providing protection for the ships' vitals. The armoured deck was 2 inches (51 mm) thick over the magazines and machinery, 1 inch (25 mm) over the steering gear and 0.75 inches (19 mm) elsewhere. The conning tower was protected by 4 inches of armour, with the gun shields having 3-inch (76 mm) armour, as did the ammunition hoists. As the protective deck was at the waterline, the ships were given a large metacentric height so that they would remain stable in the event of flooding above the armoured deck. This, however, resulted in the ships rolling badly making them poor gun platforms. One problem with the armour of the Weymouths which was shared with the other Town-class ships was the sizeable gap between the bottom of the gun shields and the deck, which allowed shell splinters to pass through the gap, and made the guns' crews vulnerable to leg injuries in combat.

== Construction and career ==
Falmouth was the ninth ship in the Royal Navy to be named after the eponymous port. The ship was laid down on 21 February 1910 by William Beardmore and Company at their Dalmuir shipyard and launched on 20 September. Upon completion in September 1911, Falmouth was assigned to the 2nd Battle Squadron of the Atlantic Fleet and was transferred to the reserve 2nd Light Cruiser Squadron of the Second Fleet at The Nore on 30 June 1913. By the end of the year, the ship had been transferred to the 5th Cruiser Squadron, also of the Second Fleet.

On the outbreak of the First World War in August 1914, she was assigned to the 1st Light Cruiser Squadron of the Grand Fleet. On 28 August 1914 she was present, but played no significant role, in the Battle of Heligoland Bight, Several months later, the Germans bombarded Scarborough, Hartlepool and Whitby on 16 December and the 1st LCS was escorting Vice-Admiral David Beatty's battlecruisers in response when it encountered a German light cruiser and a half-flotilla of torpedo boats. Falmouth was not in range to engage before the squadron turned away to follow the battlecruisers. On 28 December, the ship was transferred to the 3rd LCS and became the flagship of Rear-Admiral Trevylyan Napier, the squadron commander. During the Battle of Dogger Bank on 24 January 1915, the squadron escorted the Grand Fleet, but was not engaged. After the battle was over, the squadron escorted the battlecruisers on their way back to Cromarty, Scotland.

=== Battle of Jutland ===
Maps showing the manoeuvres of the British (blue) and German (red) fleets on 31 May – 1 June 1916

Almost a year later, Falmouth participated in the Battle of Jutland on 31 May–1 June 1916. As the battle began, the 3rd LCS was screening Beatty's battlecruisers as they searched for the German fleet and moved to support the 1st LCS after they had spotted the German ships. This put them out of position when Beatty turned south to pursue the German battlecruisers. After he turned north on encountering the main body of the German High Seas Fleet, Falmouth and her squadron were the first to encounter the screen of the Grand Fleet at 17:33. As Beatty turned east to rendezvous with them, the cruiser engaged several German ships at ranges below 7,000 yards (6,400 m) and in poor visibility. Falmouth opened fire on the disabled light cruiser SMS Wiesbaden beginning at about 18:15 and also fired a torpedo at her that missed around 18:21. She then briefly engaged two destroyers and then switched to the battlecruisers SMS Lützow and SMS Derfflinger, hitting both ships, also firing a torpedo that she mistakenly claimed to have hit around 18:25. In return, the ship was only hit once by a 15-centimetre (5.9 in) shell on the foremast that cut the voice tubes to the spotting top. By 18:40, the squadron was in position to escort the 3rd Battlecruiser Squadron of the Grand Fleet.

By 20:10, Beatty's ships were in front of the Grand Fleet and the 3rd LCS was screening them when Falmouth spotted five cruisers of the 4th Scouting Group and the squadron closed to engage at full speed. The British ships were not spotted in return until 20:17 and Falmouth opened fire a minute later at a range of 9,600 yards (8,800 m). Despite poor visibility, she hit the light cruiser SMS München twice, one of which damaged her aft boilers and impaired her ability to keep steam up. By 20:38, the British lost sight of the Germans and turned away to assume their position at the head of Beatty's battlecruisers. The cruiser fired a total of 175 shells during the battle, the most of any British light cruiser.

=== Action of 19 August 1916 ===
On the evening of 18 August, the Grand Fleet put to sea in response to a message deciphered by Room 40 that indicated that the High Seas Fleet would be leaving harbour that night. The German objective was to bombard Sunderland the following day, based on extensive reconnaissance conducted by Zeppelins and submarines. Part of the German plan was to draw the British ships through a series of submarine ambushes and Falmouth fell victim to one of the awaiting U-boats, U-66, about 16:05 the following afternoon after the Grand Fleet was headed for home. Two torpedoes only badly damaged the cruiser, but follow-on attacks were unsuccessful due to the presence of the escorting destroyers. Shortly after she was struck, the armed trawler Cooksin went alongside and took off all of the men not required to work the ship. Falmouth was able to steam through the night under her own power at a speed of 2 knots (3.7 km/h; 2.3 mph), although a pair of tugboats came out the following morning and took her in tow. Her course took her right past U-63, which put another pair of torpedoes into her around noon, despite eight escorting destroyers. The cruiser remained afloat for another eight hours before sinking off Flamborough Head, Yorkshire. No one was killed in the attacks, but one man later died of his injuries. She sits in 16 metres (52 ft) of water at 53°58.93′N 0°4.50′W. Her wreck was heavily salvaged after the war, but remains a popular diving site.

== Bibliography ==
- Brown, David K. (2010). The Grand Fleet: Warship Design and Development 1906–1922. Seaforth Publishing. ISBN 978-1-84832-085-7.
- Campbell, N. J. M. (1986). Jutland: An Analysis of the Fighting. Annapolis, Maryland: Naval Institute Press. ISBN 0-87021-324-5.
- Colledge, J. J.; Warlow, Ben & Bush, Steve (2020). Ships of the Royal Navy: The Complete Record of all Fighting Ships of the Royal Navy from the 15th Century to the Present (5th revised and updated ed.). Seaforth Publishing. ISBN 978-1-5267-9327-0.
- Corbett, Julian. Naval Operations to the Battle of the Falklands. History of the Great War: Based on Official Documents. Vol. I (2nd ed.). Imperial War Museum and Battery Press. ISBN 0-89839-256-X.
- Corbett, Julian (1997) [1929]. Naval Operations. History of the Great War: Based on Official Documents. Vol. II (Second ed.). Imperial War Museum in association with the Battery Press. ISBN 1-870423-74-7.
- Friedman, Norman (2010). British Cruisers: Two World Wars and After. Naval Institute Press. ISBN 978-1-59114-078-8.
- Lyon, David (1977). "The First Town Class 1908–31: Part 1". Warship. 1 (1). Conway Maritime Press: 48–58. ISBN 0-85177-132-7.
- Lyon, David (1977). "The First Town Class 1908–31: Part 2". Warship. 1 (2). Conway Maritime Press: 54–61. ISBN 0-85177-132-7.
- Lyon, David (1977). "The First Town Class 1908–31: Part 3". Warship. 1 (3). Conway Maritime Press: 46–51. ISBN 0-85177-132-7.
- Massie, Robert K. (2004). Castles of Steel: Britain, Germany, and the Winning of the Great War at Sea. Jonathan Cape. ISBN 0-224-04092-8.
- Newbolt, Henry (1996) [1931]. Naval Operations. History of the Great War Based on Official Documents. Vol. V. Battery Press. ISBN 0-89839-255-1.
- "HMS FALMOUTH – September 1914 to February 1915, British Home Waters, North Atlantic". Royal Navy Log Books of the World War 1 Era. Naval-History.net.
- Preston, Antony (1985). "Great Britain and Empire Forces". In Gray, Randal (ed.). Conway's All the World's Fighting Ships 1906–1921. Naval Institute Press. pp. 1–104. ISBN 0-85177-245-5.
