= HMS Weymouth (1910) =

Early 20th-century light cruiser of the British Royal Navy

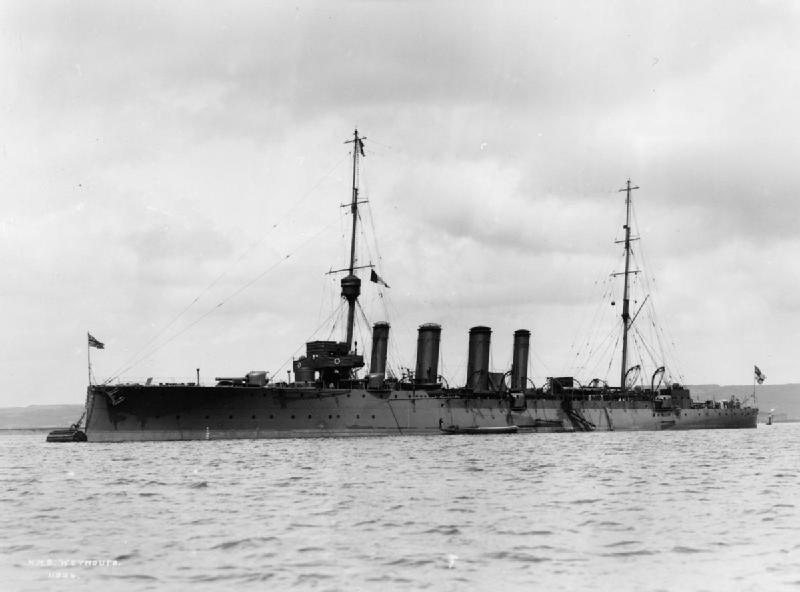
- HMS Weymouth in 1912

History

United Kingdom
- Name: Weymouth
- Namesake: Weymouth, Dorset
- Builder: Armstrong Whitworth
- Yard number: 827
- Laid down: 19 January 1910
- Launched: 18 November 1910
- Commissioned: October 1911
- Fate: Sold for scrap, 2 October 1928

General characteristics (as built)
- Class & type: Town-class light cruiser
- Displacement: 5,275 long tons (5,360 t)
- Length: 430 ft (131.1 m) p/p; 453 ft (138.1 m) o/a
- Beam: 47 ft 6 in (14.5 m)
- Draught: 15 ft 6 in (4.72 m) (mean)
- Installed power: 12 × Yarrow boilers; 22,000 shp (16,000 kW)
- Propulsion: 2 × shafts; 2 × Parsons steam turbines
- Speed: 25 knots (46 km/h; 29 mph)
- Range: 5,610 nmi (10,390 km; 6,460 mi) at 10 knots (19 km/h; 12 mph)
- Complement: 475
- Armament: 8 × single 6 in (152 mm) guns; 4 × single 3 pdr (47 mm (1.9 in)) guns; 2 × 21 in (533 mm) torpedo tubes
- Armour: Deck: .75–2 in (19–51 mm); Conning tower: 4 in (102 mm)

HMS Weymouth was a Town-class light cruiser built for the Royal Navy during the 1910s. She was the name ship of the Weymouth sub-class of the Town class. The ship survived the First World War and was sold for scrap in 1928.

== Design and description ==
The Weymouth sub-class were slightly larger and improved versions of the preceding Bristol sub-class with a more powerful armament. They were 453 feet (138.1 m) long overall, with a beam of 47 feet 6 inches (14.5 m) and a draught of 15 feet 6 inches (4.7 m). Displacement was 5,275 long tons (5,360 t) normal and 5,800 long tons (5,900 t) at full load. Twelve Yarrow boilers fed Weymouth's Parsons steam turbines, driving two propeller shafts, that were rated at 22,000 shaft horsepower (16,000 kW) for a design speed of 25 knots (46 km/h; 29 mph). The ship reached 25.95 knots (48.06 km/h; 29.86 mph) during her sea trials from 23,380 shp (17,430 kW). The boilers used both fuel oil and coal, with 1,290 long tons (1,311 t) of coal and 269 long tons (273 t) tons of oil carried, which gave a range of 5,610 nautical miles (10,390 km; 6,460 mi) at 10 knots (19 km/h; 12 mph).

The Weymouths exchanged the ten 4-inch (102 mm) guns of the Bristol sub-class for six additional BL 6-inch (152 mm) Mk XI guns. Two of these guns were mounted on the centreline fore and aft of the superstructure and two more were mounted on the forecastle deck abreast the bridge. The remaining four guns were positioned on the upper deck in waist mountings. All these guns were fitted with gun shields. Four Vickers 3-pounder (47 mm) saluting guns were also fitted. Their armament was completed by two submerged 21-inch (533 mm) torpedo tubes.

The Weymouth-class ships were considered protected cruisers, with an armoured deck providing protection for the ships' vitals. The armoured deck was 2 inches (51 mm) thick over the magazines and machinery, 1 inch (25 mm) over the steering gear and 0.75 inches (19 mm) elsewhere. The conning tower was protected by 4 inches of armour, with the gun shields having 3-inch (76 mm) armour, as did the ammunition hoists. As the protective deck was at waterline, the ships were given a large metacentric height so that they would remain stable in the event of flooding above the armoured deck. This, however, resulted in the ships rolling badly making them poor gun platforms. One problem with the armour of the Weymouths which was shared with the other Town-class ships was the sizable gap between the bottom of the gun shields and the deck, which allowed shell splinters to pass through the gap, which resulted in leg injuries to the ships' gun crews.

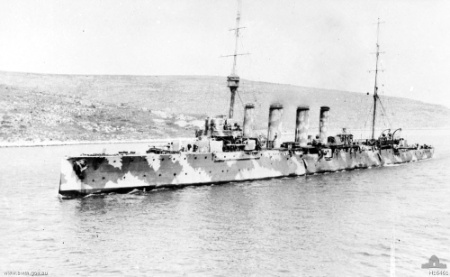
At Skyros Island, Greece in 1915 showing the new wartime camouflage paint pattern

== Construction and career ==
The ship was laid down on 19 January 1910 by Armstrong Whitworth at their Elswick shipyard and launched on 18 November. Upon completion in October 1911, Weymouth was assigned to the 3rd Battle Squadron of the Atlantic Fleet and was transferred to the 2nd Light Cruiser Squadron in the Mediterranean in June 1913. In August 1914, Weymouth was detached to sail into the Indian Ocean to hunt for the German light cruiser SMS Emden, which was raiding Allied shipping in the area. In February 1915, she was operating off the East African coast as part of operations against another commerce raider, SMS Königsberg, eventually trapping her in the Rufiji River until she could be sunk.

Weymouth was transferred to the Adriatic in December 1915. In 1916 she returned to home waters and was assigned to the 6th Light Cruiser Squadron of the Grand Fleet. In 1917 she was reassigned to the Mediterranean as part of the 8th Cruiser Squadron operating out of Brindisi. She was damaged by a torpedo from the Austro-Hungarian submarine SM U-31 on 2 October 1918. She was repaired and survived the war. She was sold on 2 October 1928 to Hughes Bolckow, of Blyth.

== Bibliography ==
- Brown, David K. (2010). The Grand Fleet: Warship Design and Development 1906–1922. Seaforth Publishing. ISBN 978-1-84832-085-7.
- Colledge, J. J.; Warlow, Ben & Bush, Steve (2020). Ships of the Royal Navy: The Complete Record of all Fighting Ships of the Royal Navy from the 15th Century to the Present (5th revised and updated ed.). Seaforth Publishing. ISBN 978-1-5267-9327-0.
- Corbett, Julian. Naval Operations to the Battle of the Falklands. History of the Great War: Based on Official Documents. Vol. I (2nd ed.). Imperial War Museum and Battery Press. ISBN 0-89839-256-X.
- Corbett, Julian (1997) [1929]. Naval Operations. History of the Great War: Based on Official Documents. Vol. II (Second ed.). Imperial War Museum in association with the Battery Press. ISBN 1-870423-74-7.
- Friedman, Norman (2010). British Cruisers: Two World Wars and After. Naval Institute Press. ISBN 978-1-59114-078-8.
- Lyon, David (1977). "The First Town Class 1908–31: Part 1". Warship. 1 (1). Conway Maritime Press: 48–58. ISBN 0-85177-132-7.
- Lyon, David (1977). "The First Town Class 1908–31: Part 2". Warship. 1 (2). Conway Maritime Press: 54–61. ISBN 0-85177-132-7.
- Lyon, David (1977). "The First Town Class 1908–31: Part 3". Warship. 1 (3). Conway Maritime Press: 46–51. ISBN 0-85177-132-7.
- Newbolt, Henry (1996) [1931]. Naval Operations. History of the Great War Based on Official Documents. Vol. V. Battery Press. ISBN 0-89839-255-1.
- Preston, Antony (1985). "Great Britain and Empire Forces". In Gray, Randal (ed.). Conway's All the World's Fighting Ships 1906–1921. Naval Institute Press. pp. 1–104. ISBN 0-85177-245-5.
