= HMS Nottingham (1913) =

British Birmingham-class light cruiser

Coordinates: 55°28′54″N 0°11′30″E

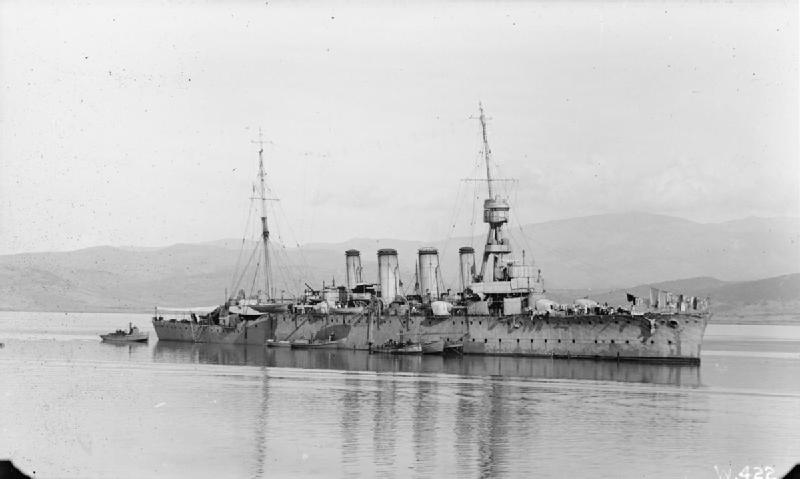
- Sister ship Lowestoft anchored off Lesbos, about 1915

History

United Kingdom
- Name: Nottingham
- Namesake: Nottingham
- Builder: Pembroke Dockyard
- Laid down: 13 June 1912
- Launched: 18 April 1913
- Completed: April 1914
- Fate: Sunk, 19 August 1916

General characteristics (as built)
- Class & type: Town-class light cruiser
- Displacement: 5,440 long tons (5,530 t)
- Length: 457 ft (139.3 m) o/a
- Beam: 50 ft (15.2 m)
- Draught: 16 ft (4.9 m)
- Installed power: 12 × Yarrow boilers; 25,000 shp (19,000 kW)
- Propulsion: 4 × shafts; 4 × steam turbines
- Speed: 25 knots (46 km/h; 29 mph)
- Range: 4,540 nmi (8,410 km; 5,220 mi) at 10 knots (19 km/h; 12 mph)
- Complement: 480
- Armament: 9 × single 6 in (152 mm) guns; 4 × single 3 pdr (47 mm (1.9 in)) guns; 2 × 21 in (533 mm) torpedo tubes
- Armour: Waterline belt: 2–3 in (51–76 mm)

HMS Nottingham was a Town-class light cruiser built for the Royal Navy just before World War I. She was one of three ships of the Birmingham sub-class and was completed in early 1914. The ship was assigned to the 1st Light Cruiser Squadron (LCS) of the Home and Grand Fleets for her entire career. Nottingham participated in most of the early fleet actions, including the battles of Heligoland Bight, Dogger Bank, and Jutland, helping to sink several German ships during the battles. The ship was sunk by the German submarine U-52 during the Action of 19 August 1916.

== Design and description ==
The Town-class cruisers were intended to protect British merchant shipping from attack by enemy cruisers. The Birminghams were a slightly larger and improved version of the preceding Chatham sub-class with a more powerful armament. The ships were 457 feet (139.3 m) long overall, with a beam of 50 feet (15.2 m) and a mean draught of 16 feet (4.9 m). Displacement was 5,440 long tons (5,530 t) at normal and 6,040 long tons (6,140 t) at deep load. They were powered by four direct-drive Parsons steam turbines, each driving one propeller shaft, which produced a total of 25,000 indicated horsepower (19,000 kW). The turbines used steam generated by a dozen Yarrow boilers that used both coal and fuel oil which gave them a speed of 25 knots (46 km/h; 29 mph). During her sea trials, Nottingham reached a speed of 25.43 knots (47.10 km/h; 29.26 mph) from 21,580 shp (16,090 kW). The Birminghams had a range of 4,540 nmi (8,410 km; 5,220 mi) at 16 knots (30 km/h; 18 mph). The ships had a crew of 480 officers and other ranks.

Their main armament consisted of nine BL 6-inch 6 in (152 mm) Mk XII guns in single mounts. Two of these were mounted on the forward of the bridge, abreast of each other; six guns were positioned amidships, three on each broadside, and the last gun was fitted on the centreline. During 1915 a QF 3 in (76 mm) 20-cwt (Note: "Cwt" is the abbreviation for hundredweight, 20 cwt referring to the weight of the gun.) anti-aircraft gun was added aft of the rear funnel. The Birminghams were also armed with a pair of submerged 21 in (533 mm) torpedo tubes, one on each side, for which they carried a total of seven torpedoes. The ships were protected by a waterline belt amidships that ranged in thickness from 2–3 inches (51–76 mm) and a 0.375–1.5-inch (9.5–38.1 mm) deck. The walls of their conning tower were 4 inches (102 mm) thick.

== Construction and career ==
Nottingham, the third ship of her name to serve in the Royal Navy, was named after the eponymous city. She was laid down on 13 June 1912, launched on 18 April 1913 and completed in April 1914. Upon commissioning that same month, the ship was assigned to the 1st LCS, together with both of her sisters. On 24 June, Nottingham was one of seven warships from the Royal Navy present in Kiel, Germany, to celebrate the re-opening of the Kiel Canal.

A few weeks after the start of World War I on 4 August, the Admiralty decided to attack German patrols in the Heligoland Bight on 28 August with the destroyers and cruisers of the Harwich Force and a flotilla of submarines. Despite some confusion at the highest levels of the Admiralty, Admiral John Jellicoe, commander of the Grand Fleet, dispatched the 1st LCS and five of his battlecruisers to reinforce the Harwich Force. During the battle, Nottingham helped to sink the light cruiser SMS Mainz and was not damaged herself. Several months later, the Germans bombarded Scarborough, Hartlepool and Whitby on 16 December and the 1st LCS was escorting Vice-Admiral David Beatty's battlecruisers in response when it encountered a German light cruiser and a half-flotilla of torpedo boats. Nottingham was not in range to engage before the squadron turned away to follow the battlecruisers. During the Battle of Dogger Bank, the ship helped to sink the armoured cruiser SMS Blücher on 23 January 1915. After the battle, the squadron helped to escort the crippled battlecruiser Lion home. Shortly after the battle, Nottingham and her sisters were transferred to the 2nd Light Cruiser Squadron by 18 March, although the squadron was also assigned to Beatty's battlecruisers. On 18 June 1915, the ship was detached to reinforce the 3rd Cruiser Squadron during a patrol across the North Sea. Nottingham and the other ships were attacked several times by German submarines, and the armoured cruiser Roxburgh was hit in the bow by a single torpedo from SM U-39 on 20 June, but managed to return to Rosyth under her own power.

=== Battle of Jutland ===
Maps showing the manoeuvres of the British (blue) and German (red) fleets on 31 May – 1 June 1916

Almost a year later, the ship participated in the Battle of Jutland on 31 May–1 June 1916. The 2nd LCS screened the battlecruisers during the battle. Nottingham helped to repel an attack by German torpedo boats around 16:26 (Note: The times used in this section are in UT, one hour behind CET, which is often used in German works.) during the first phase of the battle, the "Run to the South". After spotting the main German battlefleet at 16:30, the 2nd LCS followed Beatty's ships in a turn to the north fifteen minutes later. During the turn and afterwards, they were fired upon by eleven German battleships at very long range without significant effect. Their late turn meant that they now trailed Beatty's battlecruisers and were now even with the battleships of the attached 5th Battle Squadron by about 18:50. About 10 minutes later, the 2nd LCS engaged the crippled light cruiser SMS Wiesbaden, but were forced to disengage by the German battleships and took up station at the rear of the Grand Fleet. About a half-hour later, they fired at the disabled torpedo boat SMS V48.

Around nightfall, the squadron attacked a group of three German torpedo boats without apparent effect at 20:52, although one ship had a boiler knocked out. Less than two hours later, the squadron encountered the seven light cruisers of German 4th Scouting Group at very close range in the darkness. Nottingham was not hit during the engagement, but the squadron flagship, her half-sister Southampton, was extensively damaged and sank one of the opposing cruisers. The squadron returned home the next day without further excitement. Nottingham was not hit during the battle and expended 136 six-inch shells and one torpedo.

=== Action of 19 August 1916 ===
On the evening of 18 August, the Grand Fleet put to sea in response to a message deciphered by Room 40 that indicated that the High Seas Fleet, minus II Squadron, would be leaving harbour that night. The German objective was to bombard Sunderland the following day, based on extensive reconnaissance conducted by Zeppelins and submarines. Part of the German plan was to draw the British ships through a series of submarine ambushes and Nottingham fell victim to one of the awaiting U-boats, U-52, about 06:00 the following morning. The submarine was spotted about a half-hour prior despite the morning haze, but she was believed to be a small fishing boat and disregarded. U-52 initially hit the cruiser with two torpedoes that knocked out all power, but Nottingham was not in danger of sinking until she was hit with another torpedo 25 minutes later. Her half-sister Dublin had reported the first attack; in response, Beatty dispatched two destroyers to render assistance and they arrived about 10 minutes before Nottingham sank at 07:10. The ship lost 38 crewmen in the attack.

The majority of the casualties have no known grave with thirty-one casualties commemorated on the Plymouth Naval Memorial, two casualties commemorated on the Chatham Naval Memorial, and two casualties commemorated on the Portsmouth Naval Memorial. Three casualties were later recovered from the sea and are buried in cemeteries in the UK and Norway.

The Union Jack flown by the ship at Jutland hangs in St Mary's Church, Nottingham. It was presented by Admiral Sir William George Tennant. In December 1993, during a ceremony at Emden, Germany, Flottillenadmiral Otto H. Ciliax of the Federal German Navy presented the commanding officer of the latest HMS Nottingham with a boat's badge and ensign from the cruiser sunk in 1916, as a gesture of goodwill and reconciliation. Admiral Ciliax's father, Otto Ciliax, who was the executive officer of U-52, recovered these items off a lifeboat from the ship while picking up survivors.

In July 2025, a team of divers from ProjectXplore discovered and identified the wreck of HMS Nottingham, sixty miles (97 km) off the coast of Scotland at a depth of 82 m (269 ft).

== Bibliography ==
- Campbell, N. J. M. (1986). Jutland: An Analysis of the Fighting. Naval Institute Press. ISBN 0-87021-324-5.
- Colledge, J. J.; Warlow, Ben (2006) [1969]. Ships of the Royal Navy: The Complete Record of All Fighting Ships of the Royal Navy from the 15th Century to the Present (3rd Rev ed.). London: Chatham Publishing. ISBN 978-1-86176-281-8. OCLC 67375475.
- Friedman, Norman (2010). British Cruisers: Two World Wars and After. Naval Institute Press. ISBN 978-1-59114-078-8.
- Goldrick, James (2015). Before Jutland: The Naval War in Northern European Waters, August 1914–February 1915. Naval Institute Press. ISBN 978-1-59114-349-9.
- Jellicoe, John (1919). The Grand Fleet 1914–1916: Its Creation, Development and Work. Cassell and Company.
- Lyon, David (1977). "The First Town Class 1908–31: Part 1". Warship. 1 (1). Conway Maritime Press: 48–58. ISBN 0-85177-132-7.
- Lyon, David (1977). "The First Town Class 1908–31: Part 2". Warship. 1 (2). Conway Maritime Press: 54–61. ISBN 0-85177-132-7.
- Lyon, David (1977). "The First Town Class 1908–31: Part 3". Warship. 1 (3). Conway Maritime Press: 46–51. ISBN 0-85177-132-7.
- Massie, Robert K. (2003). Castles of Steel: Britain, Germany, and the Winning of the Great War at Sea. Random House. ISBN 0-679-45671-6.
- Newbolt, Henry (1996) [1928]. Naval Operations. History of the Great War Based on Official Documents. Vol. IV. Battery Press. ISBN 0-89839-253-5.
- Phillips, Lawrie (2014). Pembroke Dockyard and the Old Navy: A Bicentennial History. The History Press. ISBN 9780750955201.
- Preston, Antony (1985). "Great Britain and Empire Forces". In Gray, Randal (ed.). Conway's All the World's Fighting Ships 1906–1921. Naval Institute Press. pp. 1–104. ISBN 0-85177-245-5.
