= HMS Newcastle (1909) =

1909 Town-class light cruiser

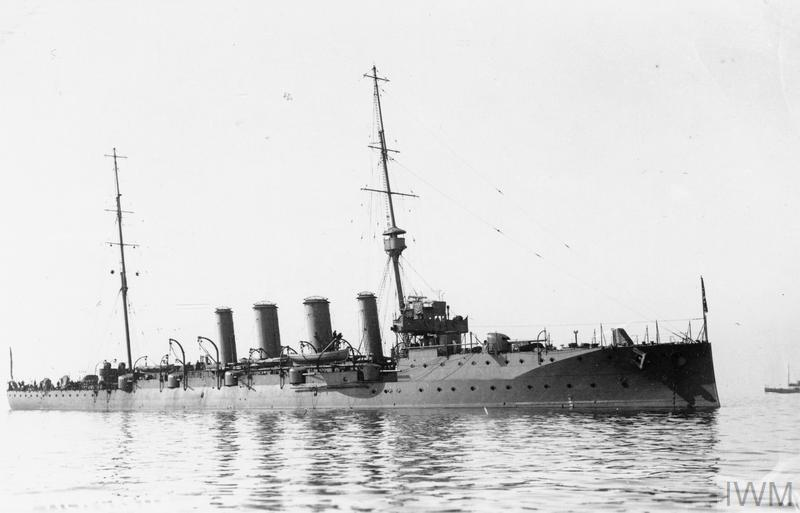
- Newcastle

History

United Kingdom
- Name: Newcastle
- Namesake: Newcastle upon Tyne
- Builder: Armstrong Whitworth
- Laid down: 14 April 1909
- Launched: 25 November 1909
- Commissioned: September 1910
- Fate: Sold for scrap, 9 May 1921

General characteristics
- Class & type: Town-class light cruiser
- Displacement: 4,800 long tons (4,900 t)
- Length: 430 ft (131.1 m) p/p; 453 ft (138.1 m) o/a
- Beam: 47 ft (14.3 m)
- Draught: 15 ft 3 in (4.65 m) (mean)
- Installed power: 12 × Yarrow boilers; 22,000 shp (16,000 kW)
- Propulsion: 4 × shafts; 2 × steam turbines
- Speed: 25 kn (46 km/h; 29 mph)
- Range: 5,830 nmi (10,800 km; 6,710 mi) at 10 knots (19 km/h; 12 mph)
- Complement: 480
- Armament: 2 × single 6 in (152 mm) guns; 10 × single 4 in (102 mm) guns; 4 × 3 pdr (47 mm (1.9 in)) guns; 2 × 18 in (457 mm) torpedo tubes
- Armour: Deck: .75–2 in (19–51 mm); Conning tower: 6 in (150 mm)

HMS Newcastle was a Town-class light cruiser of the Royal Navy launched on 25 November 1909 from the yards of Armstrong Whitworth. She formed part of the Bristol subgroup.

== Design and description ==
The Bristol sub-class (Note: Sometimes known as the Glasgow class.) were rated as second-class cruisers suitable for a variety of roles including both trade protection and duties with the fleet. They were 453 feet (138.1 m) long overall, with a beam of 47 feet (14.3 m) and a draught of 15 feet 6 inches (4.7 m). Displacement was 4,800 long tons (4,900 t) normal and 5,300 long tons (5,400 t) at full load. Twelve Yarrow boilers fed Gloucester's Parsons steam turbines, driving four propeller shafts, that were rated at 22,000 shaft horsepower (16,000 kW) for a design speed of 25 knots (46 km/h; 29 mph). The ship reached 25.85 knots (47.87 km/h; 29.75 mph) during her sea trials from 22,406 shp (16,708 kW). The boilers used both fuel oil and coal, with 1,353 long tons (1,375 t) of coal and 256 long tons (260 t) tons of oil carried, which gave a range of 5,830 nautical miles (10,800 km; 6,710 mi) at 10 knots (19 km/h; 12 mph). The ship had a crew of 480 officers and ratings.

The main armament of the Bristol class was two BL 6-inch (152 mm) Mk XI guns that were mounted on the centreline fore and aft of the superstructure and ten BL 4-inch Mk VII guns in waist mountings. All these guns were fitted with gun shields. Four Vickers 3-pounder (47 mm) saluting guns were fitted, while two submerged 18-inch (450 mm) torpedo tubes were fitted. This armament was considered rather too light for ships of this size by the Royal Navy, while the waist guns were subject to immersion in a high sea, making them difficult to work.

The Bristols were considered protected cruisers, with an armoured deck providing protection for the ships' vitals. The armoured deck was 2 inches (51 mm) thick over the magazines and machinery, 1 inch (25 mm) over the steering gear and 3/4 inch (19 mm) elsewhere. The conning tower was protected by 6 inches (150 mm) of armour, with the gun shields having 3 inches (76 mm) armour, as did the ammunition hoists. As the protective deck was at the waterline, the ships were given a large metacentric height so that they would remain stable in the event of flooding above the armoured deck. This, however, resulted in the ships rolling badly making them poor gun platforms. One problem with the armour of the Bristols, which was shared with the other Town-class ships, was the sizable gap between the bottom of the gun shields and the deck, which allowed shell splinters to pass through the gap and made the guns' crews vulnerable to leg injuries in combat.

== Service history ==
On the outbreak of the First World War she was stationed in the Far East on the China and Pacific station, being involved in operations during the Shanghai Rebellion in 1913, that had arisen as a result of the Xinhai Revolution that had broken out two years earlier. When war broke out she bombarded Yap, prior to deploying to Valparaíso to search for the armed merchant raider Prinz Eitel Friedrich. In late January 1916, Newcastle captured the German ship Mazatlan, which was then operating as the American ship Edna. In 1917 she was reassigned to the East Indies and in 1918 she was again moved to operate off South America.

After an uneventful war service in comparison with her sisters, Newcastle was sold for scrapping on 9 May 1921 to the breaking firm of Thos. W. Ward. She arrived at the yards at Lelant on 3 May 1923 to be broken up.
