= HMS Southampton (1912) =

Town-class light cruiser

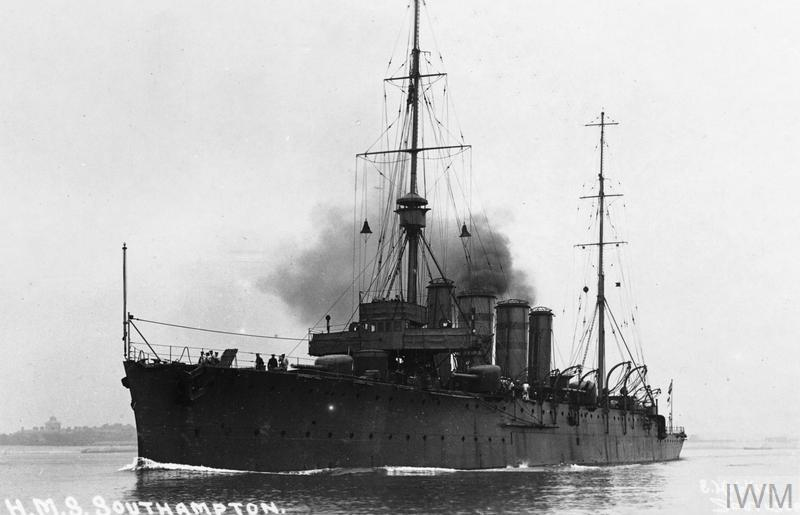
- Southampton circa 1916

History

United Kingdom
- Name: Southampton
- Namesake: Southampton
- Builder: Vickers Maxim, Barrow
- Laid down: 6 April 1911
- Launched: 16 May 1912
- Commissioned: November 1912
- Fate: Sold for scrap, 13 July 1926

General characteristics (as built)
- Class & type: Town-class light cruiser
- Displacement: 5,400 long tons (5,500 t)
- Length: 430 ft (131.1 m) p/p; 457 ft (139.3 m) o/a
- Beam: 49 ft (14.9 m)
- Draught: 16 ft (4.9 m) (mean)
- Installed power: 12 × Yarrow boilers; 25,000 shp (19,000 kW)
- Propulsion: 2 × shafts; Parsons steam turbines
- Speed: 25.5 kn (47.2 km/h; 29.3 mph)
- Range: 4,460 nmi (8,260 km; 5,130 mi) at 10 knots (19 km/h; 12 mph)
- Complement: 475
- Armament: 8 × single 6 in (152 mm) guns; 4 × single 3 pdr (47 mm (1.9 in)) guns; 2 × 21 in (533 mm) torpedo tubes
- Armour: Waterline belt: 2 in (51 mm); Deck: .375–1.5 in (9.5–38.1 mm); Conning tower: 4 in (102 mm)

HMS Southampton was a Town-class light cruiser built for the Royal Navy in the 1910s. She was a member of the Chatham sub-class of the Town class. The ship survived the First World War and was sold for scrap in 1926.

== Design and description ==
The Chatham sub-class were slightly larger and improved versions of the preceding Weymouth sub-class. They were 457 feet (139.3 m) long overall, with a beam of 49 feet (14.9 m) and a draught of 16 feet (4.9 m). Displacement was 5,400 long tons (5,500 t) normal and 6,000 long tons (6,100 t) at full load. Twelve Yarrow boilers fed Southampton's Parsons steam turbines, driving two propeller shafts, that were rated at 25,000 shaft horsepower (19,000 kW) for a design speed of 25.5 knots (47.2 km/h; 29.3 mph). The ship reached 26.1 knots (48.3 km/h; 30.0 mph) during her sea trials from 25,720 shp (19,180 kW). The boilers used both fuel oil and coal, with 1,200 long tons (1,219 t) of coal and 260 long tons (264 t) tons of oil carried, which gave a range of 4,460 nautical miles (8,260 km; 5,130 mi) at 10 knots (19 km/h; 12 mph).

The main armament of the Chathams was eight BL 6-inch Mk XI naval guns. Two of these guns were mounted on the centreline fore and aft of the superstructure and two more were mounted on the forecastle deck abreast the bridge. The remaining four guns amidships were raised to the extended forecastle deck, which meant that they could be worked in all weathers. All these guns were fitted with gun shields. Four Vickers 3-pounder (47 mm) saluting guns were also fitted. Their armament was completed by two submerged 21-inch (533 mm) torpedo tubes.

== Construction and career ==
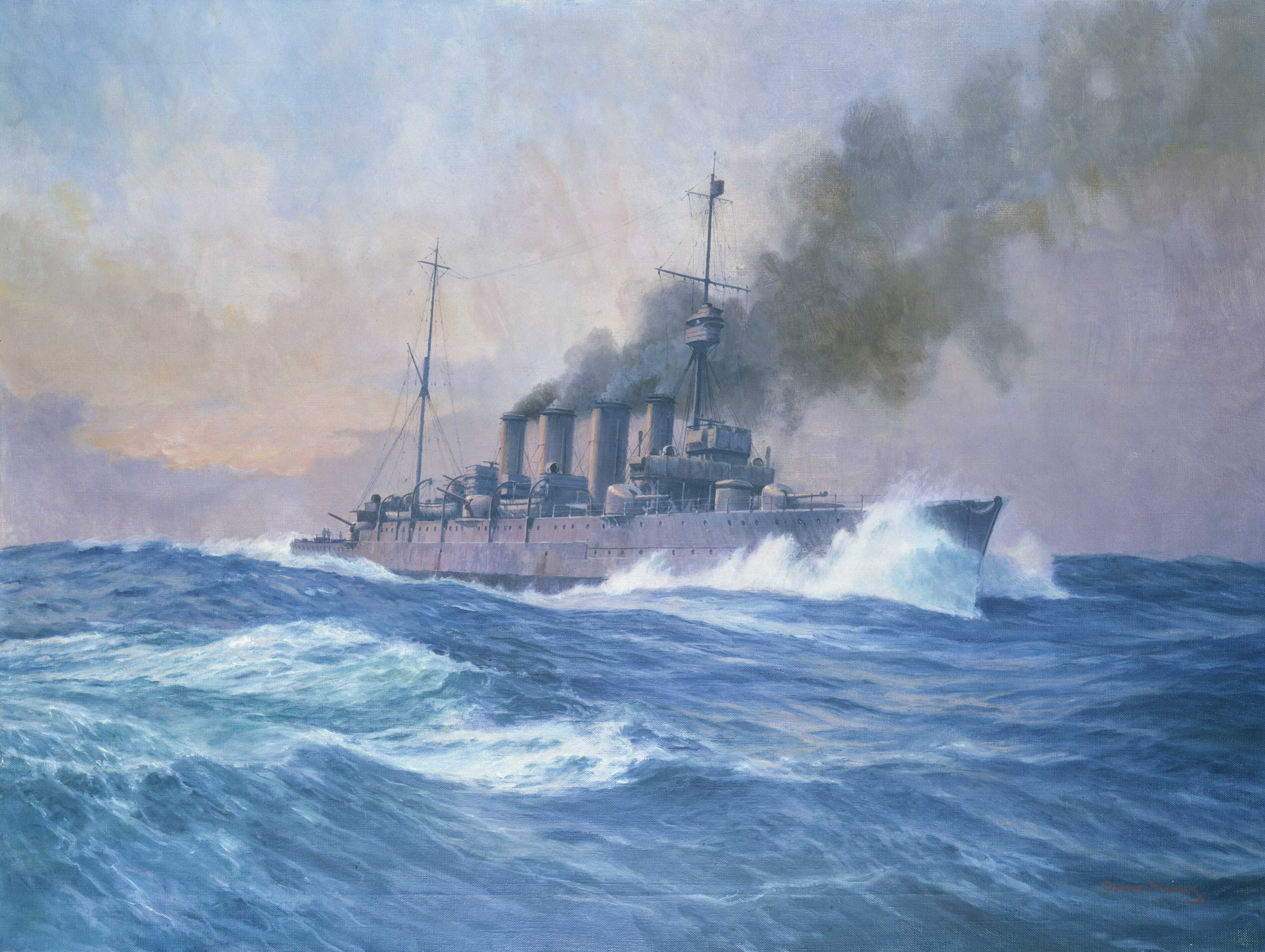
Illustration of Southampton by Oscar Parkes, 1916

Southampton was laid down on 6 April 1911 by John Brown & Company at their Clydebank shipyard and launched on 16 May 1912. Upon completion in November, the ship was assigned to the 1st Battle Squadron and she became flagship of the 1st Light Cruiser Squadron in July 1913.

The ship had an extremely active wartime career. Southampton participated in the Battle of Heligoland Bight, and later in the Battle of Dogger Bank in early 1915. In May 1916, Southampton fought in the Battle of Jutland as flagship of 2nd Light Cruiser Squadron where she torpedoed the German light cruiser SMS Frauenlob, which subsequently sank. In 1917, she was transferred to the 8th Light Cruiser Squadron with whom she remained for the rest of the war.

Southampton was sold for scrapping on 13 July 1926 to Thos. W. Ward, of Pembroke Dock.

== Bibliography ==
- Colledge, J. J.; Warlow, Ben & Bush, Steve (2020). Ships of the Royal Navy: The Complete Record of all Fighting Ships of the Royal Navy from the 15th Century to the Present (5th revised and updated ed.). Seaforth Publishing. ISBN 978-1-5267-9327-0.
- Corbett, Julian. Naval Operations to the Battle of the Falklands. History of the Great War: Based on Official Documents. Vol. I (2nd ed.). Imperial War Museum and Battery Press. ISBN 0-89839-256-X.
- Corbett, Julian (1997) [1929]. Naval Operations. History of the Great War: Based on Official Documents. Vol. II (Second ed.). Imperial War Museum in association with the Battery Press. ISBN 1-870423-74-7.
- Friedman, Norman (2010). British Cruisers: Two World Wars and After. Naval Institute Press. ISBN 978-1-59114-078-8.
- Lyon, David (1977). "The First Town Class 1908–31: Part 1". Warship. 1 (1). Conway Maritime Press: 48–58. ISBN 0-85177-132-7.
- Lyon, David (1977). "The First Town Class 1908–31: Part 2". Warship. 1 (2). Conway Maritime Press: 54–61. ISBN 0-85177-132-7.
- Lyon, David (1977). "The First Town Class 1908–31: Part 3". Warship. 1 (3). Conway Maritime Press: 46–51. ISBN 0-85177-132-7.
- Newbolt, Henry (1996) [1931]. Naval Operations. History of the Great War Based on Official Documents. Vol. V. Battery Press. ISBN 0-89839-255-1.
- Preston, Antony (1985). "Great Britain and Empire Forces". In Gray, Randal (ed.). Conway's All the World's Fighting Ships 1906–1921. Naval Institute Press. pp. 1–104. ISBN 0-85177-245-5.
