= Town-class cruiser =

Town-class cruiser can refer to:

- Town-class cruiser (1910)
- Town-class cruiser (1936)

== See also ==
- Town-class destroyer
