= HMS Birmingham (1913) =

Town-class light cruiser

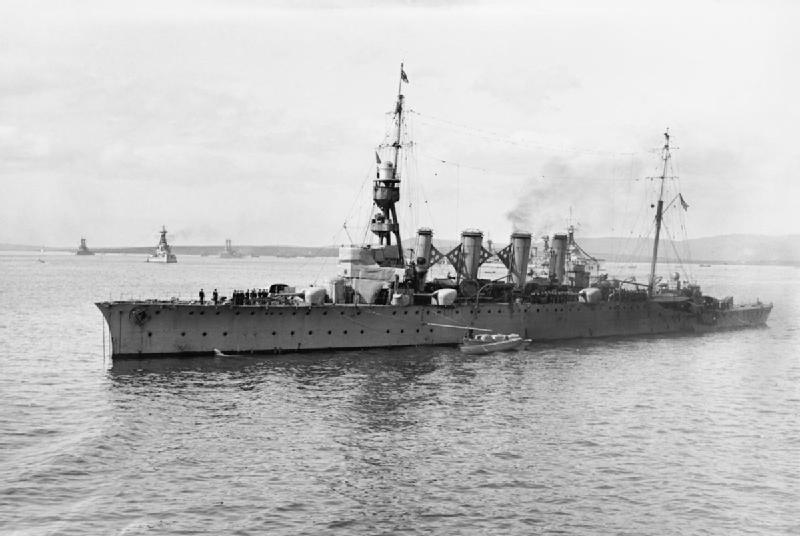
- Birmingham in 1916

History

United Kingdom
- Name: Birmingham
- Namesake: Birmingham
- Ordered: under 1911 Naval Estimates
- Builder: Armstrong Whitworth, Elswick
- Yard number: 851
- Laid down: 10 June 1912
- Launched: 7 May 1913
- Completed: 30 January 1914
- Commissioned: February 1914
- Fate: Sold for scrap, February 1931

General characteristics
- Class & type: Town-class light cruiser
- Displacement: 5,440 long tons (5,530 t)
- Length: 457 ft (139.3 m) o/a
- Beam: 50 ft (15.2 m)
- Draught: 15 ft 9 in (4.80 m)
- Installed power: 12 × Yarrow boilers; 25,000 shp (19,000 kW)
- Propulsion: 4 × steam turbines; 2 × shafts
- Speed: 25.5 knots (47.2 km/h; 29.3 mph)
- Range: 4,680 nmi (8,670 km; 5,390 mi) at 10 knots (19 km/h; 12 mph)
- Complement: 433
- Armament: 9 × 6 in (152 mm) guns; 4 × 3 pdr (47 mm (1.9 in)) guns; 2 × machine guns; 2 × 21 in (533 mm) torpedo tubes
- Armour: Belt: 3 in (76 mm) tapering to 1.5 in (38 mm) fore and 1.75 in (44 mm) aft; Deck: 0.75–1.5 in (19–38 mm) over vital spaces, 0.4 in (10 mm) elsewhere; Gun Shields: 4 in (102 mm); Conning Tower: 4 in (102 mm)

HMS Birmingham was the lead ship of the Birmingham group of three ships of the Town-class light cruisers built by the Royal Navy shortly before the start of the First World War in 1914. Her sister ships were Lowestoft and Nottingham. The three ships were virtually identical to the third group of Town-class ships, but with an additional 6 in (152 mm) gun worked in on the forecastle.

== History ==
Birmingham, a two-screw ship, was built at Elswick, launched on 7 May 1913 and completed on 30 January 1914. She joined the 1st Light Cruiser Squadron of the Grand Fleet in 1914, visiting Kiel in June that year.

On 9 August 1914, she spotted the U-15, whose engines had failed as she lay stopped on the surface in heavy fog, off Fair Isle. The crew of Birmingham could hear hammering from inside the boat from attempted repairs, and so fired on her but missed. As the U-boat began to dive, she rammed her, cutting her in two. U-15 went down with all hands, the first U-boat loss to an enemy warship. Birmingham also sank two German merchant ships that year and took part in the Battle of Heligoland on 28 August, and the Battle of Dogger Bank in January 1915.

In February, she joined the 2nd Light Cruiser Squadron, attacking a u-boat on 18 June 1915 without success.

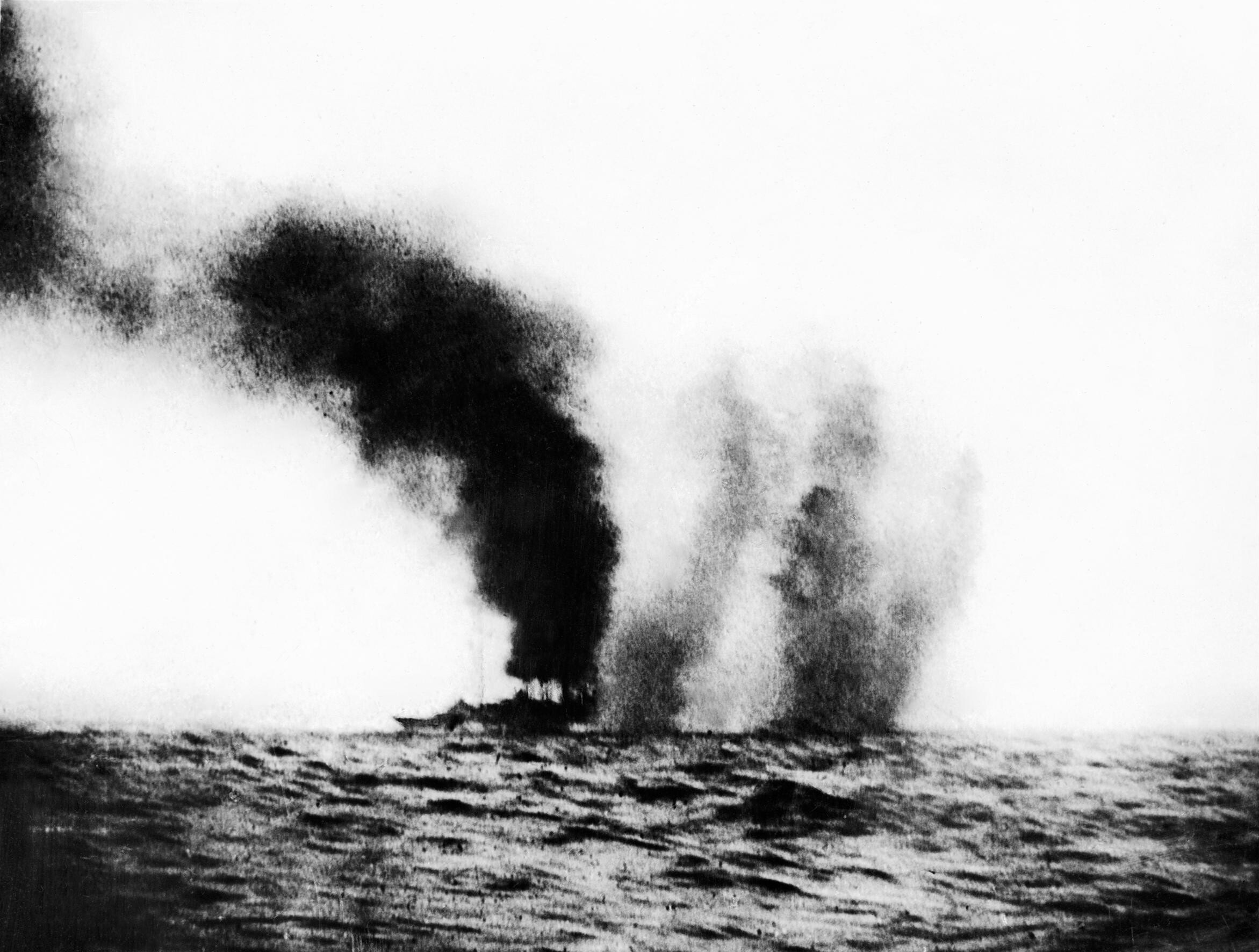
Birmingham under fire at the Battle of Jutland

She also took part in the Battle of Jutland as a member of the 2nd Light Cruiser Squadron, during which she sustained damage caused by splintering during the night of the battle.

After the First World War, she was flagship to the 6th Light Cruiser Squadron in 1919–1920, after which she was transferred to the Nore from 1920 to 1922. Considered (with two other two shaft 'Towns') for conversion to a minelayer, but the idea was not pursued. She was recommissioned in November 1923 to the Africa Station with the 6th Light Cruiser Squadron as Flagship, relieving Lowestoft. She then continued to serve in foreign stations until being sold in 1931. She arrived at the yards of Thos. W. Ward, of Pembroke Dock on 12 March that year to be broken up.

== Bibliography ==
- Colledge, J. J.; Warlow, Ben & Bush, Steve (2020). Ships of the Royal Navy: The Complete Record of all Fighting Ships of the Royal Navy from the 15th Century to the Present (5th revised and updated ed.). Seaforth Publishing. ISBN 978-1-5267-9327-0.
- Corbett, Julian. Naval Operations to the Battle of the Falklands. History of the Great War: Based on Official Documents. Vol. I (2nd ed.). Imperial War Museum and Battery Press. ISBN 0-89839-256-X.
- Corbett, Julian (1997) [1929]. Naval Operations. History of the Great War: Based on Official Documents. Vol. II (Second ed.). Imperial War Museum in association with the Battery Press. ISBN 1-870423-74-7.
- Friedman, Norman (2010). British Cruisers: Two World Wars and After. Naval Institute Press. ISBN 978-1-59114-078-8.
- Lyon, David (1977). "The First Town Class 1908–31: Part 1". Warship. 1 (1). Conway Maritime Press: 48–58. ISBN 0-85177-132-7.
- Lyon, David (1977). "The First Town Class 1908–31: Part 2". Warship. 1 (2). Conway Maritime Press: 54–61. ISBN 0-85177-132-7.
- Lyon, David (1977). "The First Town Class 1908–31: Part 3". Warship. 1 (3). Conway Maritime Press: 46–51. ISBN 0-85177-132-7.
- Newbolt, Henry (1996) [1931]. Naval Operations. History of the Great War Based on Official Documents. Vol. V. Battery Press. ISBN 0-89839-255-1.
