= HMS Lowestoft (1913) =

Town-class light cruiser

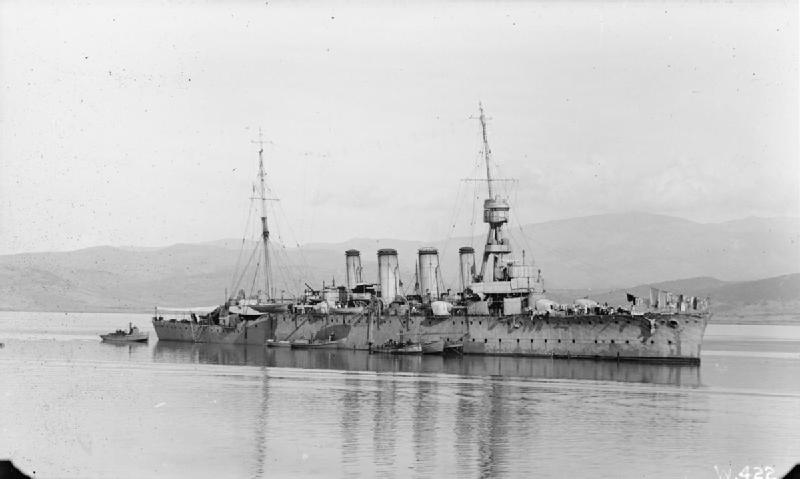
- Lowestoft in 1917 at Kalloni, Lesbos

History

United Kingdom
- Name: HMS Lowestoft
- Namesake: Lowestoft
- Ordered: under 1911 Naval Estimates
- Builder: Chatham Dockyard
- Laid down: 29 July 1912
- Launched: 23 April 1913
- Commissioned: 21 April 1914
- Fate: Sold for scrap, 8 January 1931

General characteristics (as built)
- Class & type: Town-class light cruiser
- Displacement: 5,440 long tons (5,530 t)
- Length: 430 ft (131.1 m) (p/p); 457 ft (139.3 m) (o/a)
- Beam: 50 ft (15.2 m)
- Draught: 16 ft (4.9 m) (mean)
- Installed power: 12 × Yarrow boilers; 25,000 shp (19,000 kW)
- Propulsion: 4 × shafts; 3 × steam turbines
- Speed: 25.5 knots (47.2 km/h; 29.3 mph)
- Range: 4,140 nautical miles (7,670 km; 4,760 mi) at 10 knots (19 km/h; 12 mph)
- Complement: 480
- Armament: 9 × single 6 in (152 mm) guns; 4 × single 3 pdr (47 mm (1.9 in)) guns; 2 × 21 in (533 mm) torpedo tubes
- Armour: Waterline belt: 2 in (51 mm); Deck: .375–1.5 in (9.5–38.1 mm); Conning Tower: 4 in (102 mm)

HMS Lowestoft was a Town-class light cruiser built for the Royal Navy in the 1910s. She was a member of the Birmingham sub-class of the Town class. She survived World War I and was sold for scrap in 1931.

== Design and description ==
The Birmingham sub-class were slightly larger and improved versions of the preceding Chatham sub-class. They were 457 feet (139.3 m) long overall, with a beam of 50 feet (15.2 m) and a draught of 16 feet (4.9 m). Displacement was 5,440 long tons (5,530 t) normal and 6,040 long tons (6,140 t) at full load. Twelve Yarrow boilers fed Lowestoft's Parsons steam turbines, driving four propeller shafts, that were rated at 25,000 shaft horsepower (19,000 kW) for a design speed of 25.5 knots (47.2 km/h; 29.3 mph). The ship reached 25.4 knots (47.0 km/h; 29.2 mph) during her sea trials from 23,620 shp (17,610 kW). The boilers used both fuel oil and coal, with 1,165 long tons (1,184 t) of coal and 235 long tons (239 t) tons of oil carried, which gave a range of 4,140 nautical miles (7,670 km; 4,760 mi) at 10 knots (19 km/h; 12 mph).

The primary improvement of the Birminghams over the Chathams was the introduction of lighter, easier to work, BL 6-inch (152 mm) Mk XII guns. The lighter guns allowed the addition of another weapon forward of the superstructure. One of these guns was mounted on the centreline aft of the superstructure and two more were mounted on the forecastle deck abreast the bridge. The remaining four guns positioned amidships, two on each broadside. All these guns were fitted with gun shields. Four Vickers 3-pounder (47 mm) saluting guns were also fitted. The armament was completed by two submerged 21-inch (533 mm) torpedo tubes.

== Construction and career ==
The ship was laid down on 29 July 1912 by Chatham Royal Dockyard and launched on 23 April 1913. Upon completion in April 1914, Lowestoft was assigned to the 1st Light Cruiser Squadron of the Grand Fleet, and in August 1914 she sank a German merchant ship. On 28 August 1914, she participated in the Battle of Heligoland Bight, and on 24 January 1915 Lowestoft took part in the Battle of Dogger Bank. In February 1915, she was reassigned to the 2nd Light Cruiser Squadron, and in 1916 reassigned again to the 8th Light Cruiser Squadron, operating in the Mediterranean. She survived the war and was sold for scrap on 8 January 1931 to Thos. W. Ward, of Milford Haven.

== Bibliography ==
- Colledge, J. J.; Warlow, Ben & Bush, Steve (2020). Ships of the Royal Navy: The Complete Record of all Fighting Ships of the Royal Navy from the 15th Century to the Present (5th revised and updated ed.). Seaforth Publishing. ISBN 978-1-5267-9327-0.
- Corbett, Julian. Naval Operations to the Battle of the Falklands. History of the Great War: Based on Official Documents. Vol. I (2nd ed.). Imperial War Museum and Battery Press. ISBN 0-89839-256-X.
- Corbett, Julian (1997) [1929]. Naval Operations. History of the Great War: Based on Official Documents. Vol. II (Second ed.). Imperial War Museum in association with the Battery Press. ISBN 1-870423-74-7.
- Friedman, Norman (2010). British Cruisers: Two World Wars and After. Naval Institute Press. ISBN 978-1-59114-078-8.
- Lyon, David (1977). "The First Town Class 1908–31: Part 1". Warship. 1 (1). Conway Maritime Press: 48–58. ISBN 0-85177-132-7.
- Lyon, David (1977). "The First Town Class 1908–31: Part 2". Warship. 1 (2). Conway Maritime Press: 54–61. ISBN 0-85177-132-7.
- Lyon, David (1977). "The First Town Class 1908–31: Part 3". Warship. 1 (3). Conway Maritime Press: 46–51. ISBN 0-85177-132-7.
- Newbolt, Henry (1996) [1931]. Naval Operations. History of the Great War Based on Official Documents. Vol. V. Battery Press. ISBN 0-89839-255-1.
