= Battle Cruiser Fleet =

Former naval fleet of the Royal Navy

- White Ensign
- Active: 1915–1919
- Country: United Kingdom
- Allegiance: British Empire
- Branch: Royal Navy
- Type: Fleet
- Engagements: Battle of Jutland

The Battle Cruiser Fleet, (BCF), later known as Battle Cruiser Force, a naval formation of fast battlecruisers of the Royal Navy, operated from 1915 to 1919.

== History ==
The Fleet was formed on 11 February 1915 when the Admiralty ordered the deployment of its faster Battlecruiser squadrons to the Rosyth Command and grouped them together as the new Battle Cruiser Fleet. The name 'Fleet' remained until 1916 although it was officially subordinate to the Commander-in-Chief, Grand Fleet. The fleet initially contained the 1st, 2nd and 3rd Battlecruiser Squadrons but this was reduced to the 1st and 2nd BC Squadrons in June 1916. It also included two light cruiser squadrons and two destroyer flotillas, in addition the new 5th Battle Squadron that included the new fast Queen Elizabeth-class battleships operated with the fleet. On 29 November 1916 it was renamed Battle Cruiser Force. The force was disbanded in April 1919.

== Vice-Admirals commanding ==
Post holders included:

	Rank	Flag	Name	Term	Notes
Vice-Admiral Commanding, Battle Cruiser Fleet/Force
1	Vice-Admiral	Rear-Admiral - Royal Navy	Sir David R. Beatty	8 February 1915	(acting V.Adm)
2	Vice-Admiral	Vice-Admiral - Royal Navy	Sir William C. Pakenham	29 November 1916	
3	Vice-Admiral	Rear-Admiral - Royal Navy	Sir Henry F. Oliver	28 February 1919 – 21 March 1919	(temporary Cdg)
4	Vice-Admiral	Vice-Admiral - Royal Navy	Sir Roger J. B. Keyes	21 March 1919 – 7 April 1919	(acting V.Adm)

=== Chiefs of staff ===
Post holders included:

	Rank	Flag	Name	Term	Notes
Chief of Staff, Battle Cruiser Fleet/Force
1	Captain		Rudolf W. Bentinck	February 1915-June 1916	
2	Captain		the Hon. Hubert G. Brand	June–December 1916	
3	Captain		Edward H. Heaton-Ellis	December 1916-August 1917	
4	Captain		Hugh F. P. Sinclair	August 1917-December 1918	
5	Captain		William H.D. Boyle	December 1918-March 1919	

== Components ==
Included

	Unit	Elements	Notes
Main components at various times attached to BCF from 8 February 1915 to 4 April 1919
1	1st Battlecruiser Squadron	4/5 Battle Cruisers	
2	2nd Battlecruiser Squadron	3/4 Battle Cruisers	
3	3rd Battlecruiser Squadron	3/4 Battle Cruisers	detached 05/1916
4	5th Battle Squadron	5 fast battleships	special unit of fast battleships operating with BCF
5	1st Cruiser Squadron	4 cruisers	attached 02/1915 - 06/1916
6	2nd Cruiser Squadron	4 cruisers	attached 02-1915 - 06/1916
7	3rd Cruiser Squadron	3/4 cruisers	attached 02-1915 - 09/1916
8	6th Cruiser Squadron	4/5 cruisers	attached 02/1915 - 10/1917
9	7th Cruiser Squadron	4/5 cruisers	attached 02/1915 - 05/1916
10	1st Light Cruiser Squadron	11 Town-class	from 02/1915 to 09/1918
11	2nd Light Cruiser Squadron	10 Town-class replaced by C Class	from 02/1915 to 05/1918
12	3rd Light Cruiser Squadron		from 02/1915 to 05/1918
13	4th Light Cruiser Squadron	5 C-class cruisers and 1 Arethusa-class cruiser	from 06/1915 to 1919
14	6th Light Cruiser Squadron	5 C-class cruisers	from 07/1917 to 1919
15	7th Light Cruiser Squadron	6 Arethusa-class cruisers/ C-class cruisers	from 03/1918 to 11/1918
16	1st Destroyer Flotilla	1 Cruiser (L) 20 destroyers	from the Harwich Force - 02/1915 to 11/1916 detached to Nore Command
17	2nd Destroyer Flotilla	1 Cruiser (L) 18/22 destroyers	ditto from 02/1915 to 04/1916 detached to Devonport
18	3rd Destroyer Flotilla	14 destroyers	from the Harwich Force, 02/1918 to 1918
19	4th Destroyer Flotilla	1 cruiser (FS) 2/3 cruiser (L) 20 destroyers	from 02/1915 to 09/1916 detached to Humber
20	9th Destroyer Flotilla	22 L Class	from 02/1915
21	11th Destroyer Flotilla	1/2 cruiser (L) 25 destroyers	formed 09/1915
22	12th Destroyer Flotilla	1/2 cruiser (L) 25 destroyers	formed 11/1915
23	13th Destroyer Flotilla	4 M Class, 10 R Class, 26 V & W Class	
24	14th Destroyer Flotilla	2 cruiser (L) 32 destroyers	formed 08/1916
25	15th Destroyer Flotilla	2 cruiser (L) 22 destroyers	formed 09/1916
26	20th Destroyer Flotilla	2 cruiser (L) 12 destroyers	formed 1918 initially a mine laying flotilla
27	Scapa Local Flotilla	8 destroyers	formed 1918
28	1st Minesweeper Flotilla	12 minesweepers	formed 1915
29	2nd Minesweeper Flotilla	6 minesweepers	formed 1916
30	3rd Minesweeper Flotilla	14 minesweepers	formed 1918
The Fleet/Force consisted of approximately 250-300 ships

== Sources ==
- Harley, Simon; Lovell, Tony. (2015) "Battle Cruiser Force - The Dreadnought Project". www.dreadnoughtproject.org. Harley and Lovell.
- Jordan, John. (2011). Warships after Washington: The Development of Five Major Fleets 1922–1930. Barnsley, England: Seaforth Publishing. ISBN 9781848321175.
- Mace, Martin. (2014). The Royal Navy and the War at Sea 1914–1919. Barnsley, England: Pen and Sword. ISBN 9781781593172.
- Mackie, Colin. (2018) "Royal Navy Senior Appointments" (PDF). gulabin.com. Colin Mackie.
- Smith, Gordon. (2015) "Royal Navy ship dispositions 1914–1918". www.naval-history.net. Gordon Smith.
- Trevor, Royle. (2007). The flowers of the forest : Scotland and the First World War. Birlinn. ISBN 9781843410300.
- Watson, Dr Graham. (2015) "Royal Navy Organisation and Ship Deployment, Inter-War Years 1914–1918". www.naval-history.net. Gordon Smith.
