= Town-class cruiser (1910) =

Class of light cruisers built for the Royal Navy (RN) and Royal Australian Navy

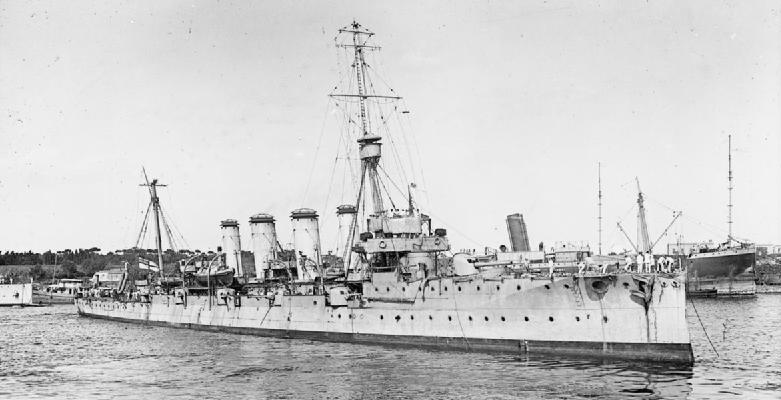
- HMS Gloucester

Class overview
- Name: Town class
- Operators: Royal Navy; Royal Australian Navy
- Preceded by: Active class, Topaze class
- Succeeded by: Hawkins class, Arethusa-class (1913)
- Subclasses: Bristol; Weymouth; Chatham; Birmingham; Birkenhead
- Built: 1909–1916 (RN) 1911–1922 (RAN)
- In commission: 1910–1931 (RN) 1920–1926 (RNZN) 1922–1949 (RAN)
- Completed: 21
- Lost: 2
- Scrapped: 19

General characteristics
- Type: Light cruiser
- Displacement: 4,800–5,440 long tons (4,880–5,530 t)
- Length: 453–462 ft (138.1–140.8 m) (o/a)
- Beam: 48–50 ft (14.6–15.2 m)
- Draught: 14–16 ft (4.3–4.9 m)
- Installed power: 22,000–25,000 shp (16,000–19,000 kW); 12 × Yarrow boilers
- Propulsion: 4 shafts, 2 steam turbine sets
- Speed: 25 knots (46 km/h; 29 mph)
- Range: 4,140–5,830 nautical miles (7,670–10,800 km; 4,760–6,710 mi) at 10 knots (19 km/h; 12 mph)
- Complement: 310–480
- Armament: Bristol subclass : Two BL 6-inch (152 mm) Mk XI guns (50 calibre); ten BL 4-inch (101.6 mm) Mk VII guns; four QF 3 pounder (47-mm) guns; Two 18 inch (450 mm) torpedo tubes; Weymouth, Chatham, Birmingham subclasses : Eight to nine BL 6- inch (Mk XI (50 calibre) guns or Mk XII (45 calibre) guns; four QF 3 pounder (47-mm) guns; Two 21 inch (533 mm) torpedo tubes; Birkenhead subclass : Ten BL 5.5 inch (140 mm) Mk I (50 calibre) guns; One 3 inch (76 mm) anti-aircraft gun; Two 21 inch (533 mm) torpedo tubes
- Armour: Bristol, Weymouth subclasses : Deck: .75–2 in (19–51 mm); Conning tower: 4 in (102 mm); Gun Shields: 4 in (102 mm); Chatham, Birmingham, Birkenhead subclasses: Belt: 1.5–3 in (38–76 mm); Deck: 0.4–1.5 in (10–38 mm); Gun Shields: 4 in (102 mm); Conning tower: 4 in (102 mm)

The Town class was a group of twenty-one light cruisers built for the Royal Navy (RN) and Royal Australian Navy (RAN) of the first half of the 20th century. These vessels were long-range cruisers, suitable for patrolling the vast expanse covered by the British Empire. These ships, initially rated as second class cruisers, were built to a series of designs, known as the Bristol (five ships), Weymouth (four ships), Chatham (three RN ships, plus three RAN ships), Birmingham (three ships, plus one similar RAN ship) and Birkenhead (two ships) classes – all having the names of British towns except for the RAN ships, which were named after Australian cities.

In 1911, the system for classifying cruisers changed such that ships over 6,000 tons were simply 'cruisers'. This would have included armoured cruisers and 1st class protected cruiser. The smaller protected cruisers, scout cruisers, and the new Towns were to be 'light cruisers'. Effectively then, the Weymouths were the first Royal Navy ships built as light cruisers

== Design ==
=== Bristol subclass ===
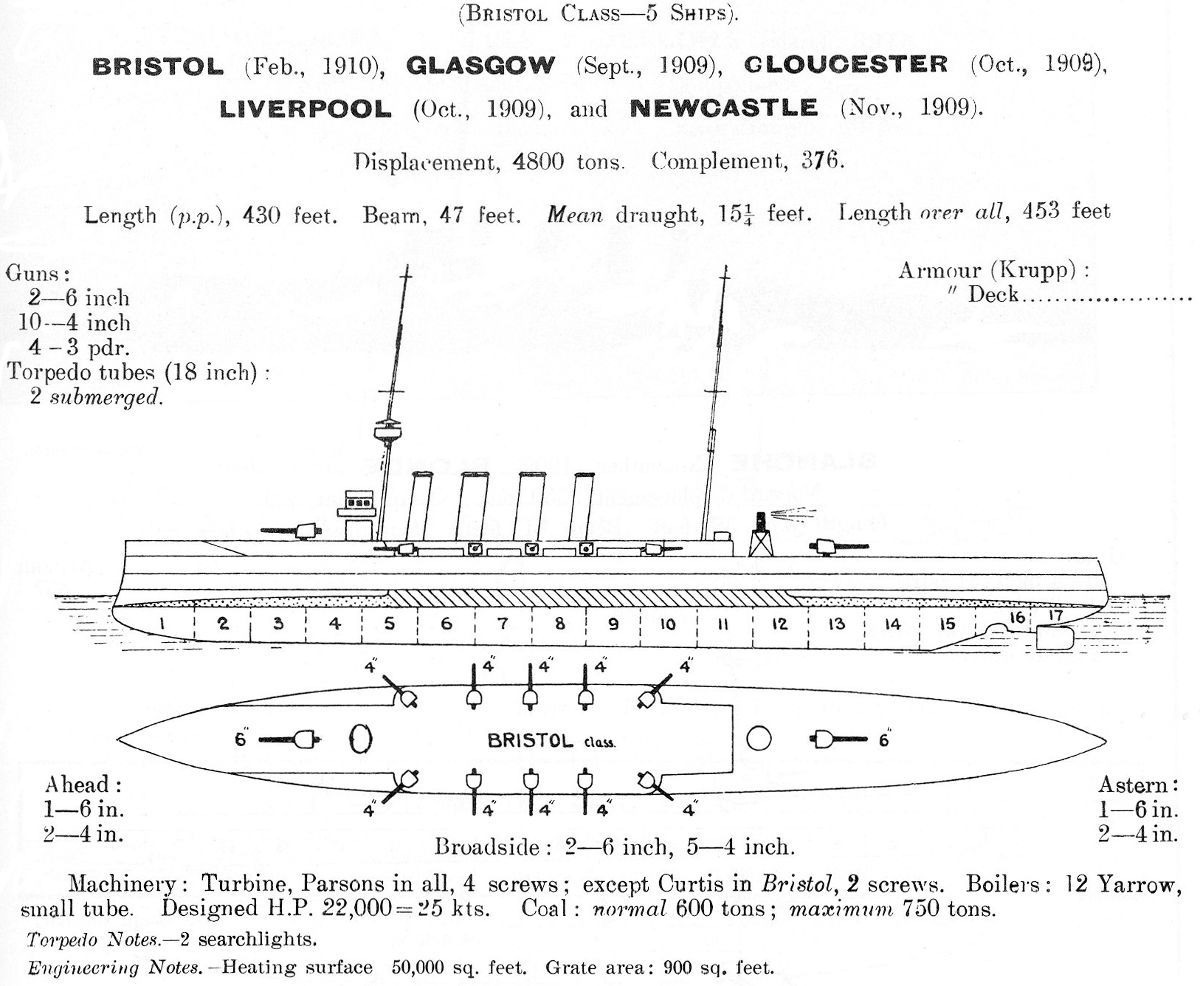
Left elevation and deck plan of Bristol sub-class as depicted in Jane's Fighting Ships 1914

The Bristols (Note: Sometimes known as the Glasgow subclass.) were all ordered under the 1908–09 Programme and commissioned in late 1910. They were second class cruisers suitable for a variety of roles including both trade protection and fleet duties. They were 453 feet (138.1 m) long overall, with a beam of 47 feet (14.3 m) and a draught of 15 feet 6 inches (4.7 m). Displacement was 4,800 long tons (4,900 t) normal and 5,300 long tons (5,400 t) full load. Twelve Yarrow three-drum boilers fed steam turbines rated at 22,000 shaft horsepower (16,000 kW), giving a speed of 25 knots (46 km/h; 29 mph). One ship, Bristol, had Brown-Curtis turbines driving two propeller shafts, while the remaining three ships used Parsons turbines driving four shafts. Speed during sea trials varied between 25.856 knots (47.885 km/h; 29.755 mph) (Glasgow) and 27.012 knots (50.026 km/h; 31.085 mph) (Bristol). The experimental two-shaft layout of Bristol was successful, giving greater efficiency, especially at lower speeds. The ships used both coal and oil for fuel, with 1353 tons of coal and 260 tons of oil carried, giving an endurance of about 5,070 nautical miles (9,390 km; 5,830 mi) at 16 knots (30 km/h; 18 mph).

The Bristols were protected cruisers, with an armoured deck providing protection for the ships' vitals. The armoured deck was 2 inches (51 mm) thick over the magazines and machinery, 1 inch (25 mm) over the steering gear and 3/4 inch (19 mm) elsewhere. The conning tower was protected by 6 inches (150 mm) of armour, with the gun shields having 3 inches (76 mm) armour, as did the ammunition hoists. As the protective deck was at waterline, the ships were given a large metacentric height so that they would remain stable in the event of flooding above the armoured deck. This, however, resulted in the ships rolling badly, making them poor gun platforms. One problem with the armour of the Bristols which was shared with the other Town-class ships was the sizable gap between the bottom of the gun shields and the deck, which allowed shell splinters to pass through the gap, leading to large numbers of leg injuries in the ships' gun crews.

It was originally intended that the Bristols would be fitted with a main gun armament of unshielded 4-inch (102 mm) guns, but the need to counter German light cruisers (such as the Königsberg class), which were armed with ten 105-millimetre (4.1 in) guns that outranged British 4-inch guns, resulted in the new class's armament being revised. They had two BL 6-inch (152 mm) Mk XI naval guns mounted on the ships' centreline fore and aft, with ten BL 4-inch Mk VII guns in waist mountings. All these guns were fitted with shields. Four Vickers 3-pounder (47 mm) saluting guns were fitted, while two submerged 18 inch (450 mm) torpedo tubes were fitted, with seven torpedoes carried. This armament was considered rather too light for ships of this size, while the waist guns were subject to immersion in a high sea, making them difficult to work.

They had a crew of 480 officers and men, with the officers accommodated in the forward part of the ship, rather than aft as per tradition, following the instructions of Admiral Fisher to improve fighting efficiency. This arrangement was unpopular, however, as it was preferred to keep officer's and other ranks accommodation separate for disciplinary reasons, while the Bristols were very cramped, with only 12.5 square feet (1.16 m^{2}) for each seaman to live, eat, and sleep. In the First World War, the class's anti-aircraft armament was increased with the fitting of a single QF 3 inch (76 mm) 20 cwt gun.

=== Weymouth subclass ===
The Weymouth subclass (Note: Often known as the Falmouth subclass, particularly in contemporary accounts.) were ordered under the 1909–1910 Programme and commissioned between 1911 and 1912. Major changes from the Bristol subclass included a heavier main armament of eight 6 in guns, and changes to improve seaworthiness and reduce overcrowding. They were 453 feet (138.1 m) long overall, with a beam of 48 feet 6 inches (14.78 m) and a draught of 15 feet 6 inches (4.7 m). Displacement was 5,250 long tons (5,330 t) normal and 5,800 long tons (5,900 t) full load. Machinery was similar to the Bristol subclass, with again a single example (Yarmouth) having the Brown-Curtis turbines and two-shaft arrangement used in the Bristols, while the remaining three ships had the four-shaft, Yarrow turbine machinery. Speed remained 25 knots.

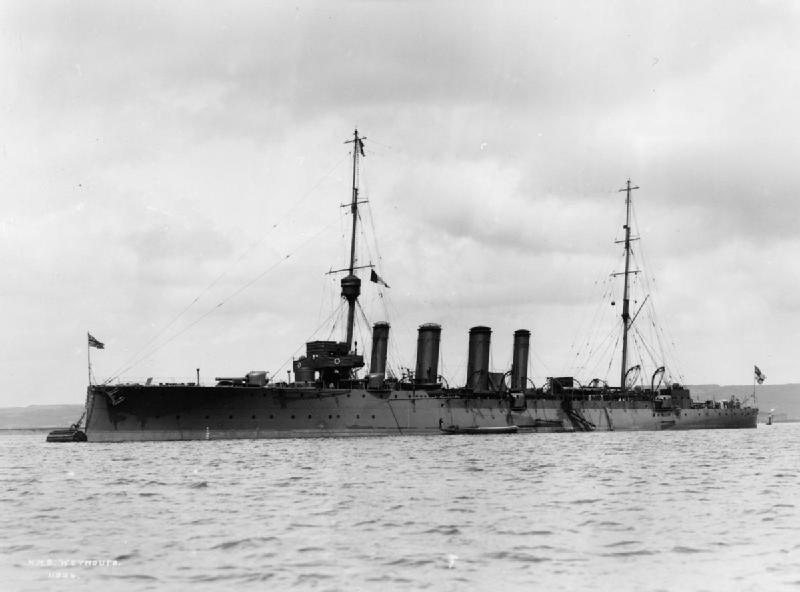
HMS Weymouth

Armour remained unchanged from the Bristols, while the main gun armament was changed to eight BL 6 inch Mk XI guns. The arrangement of the armament was revised, with three guns (one on the centreline and two on the beam) on an enlarged forecastle that also provided accommodation for the ships' officers. The remaining waist guns were protected by a bulwark to make them more weather resistant. Torpedo armament was increased, with two 21-inch (533 mm) submerged tubes (with seven torpedoes carried), while the ships' armament was completed by four 3-pounder saluting guns.

The Weymouths saw a number of alterations during the war, including the addition of a single 3 in (76 mm) AA gun in 1915, while the surviving ships were fitted with director control equipment for the ships' guns on a new tripod foremast. In 1917, Yarmouth was the first light cruiser to be able to operate aircraft, being fitted with a ramp above the conning tower and forecastle gun to allow a Sopwith Pup to be launched from the ship, although the aircraft could not land back on it so the pilot would have to ditch into the sea if it was not possible to reach land. In 1918, Weymouth also received a similar installation.

=== Chatham subclass ===
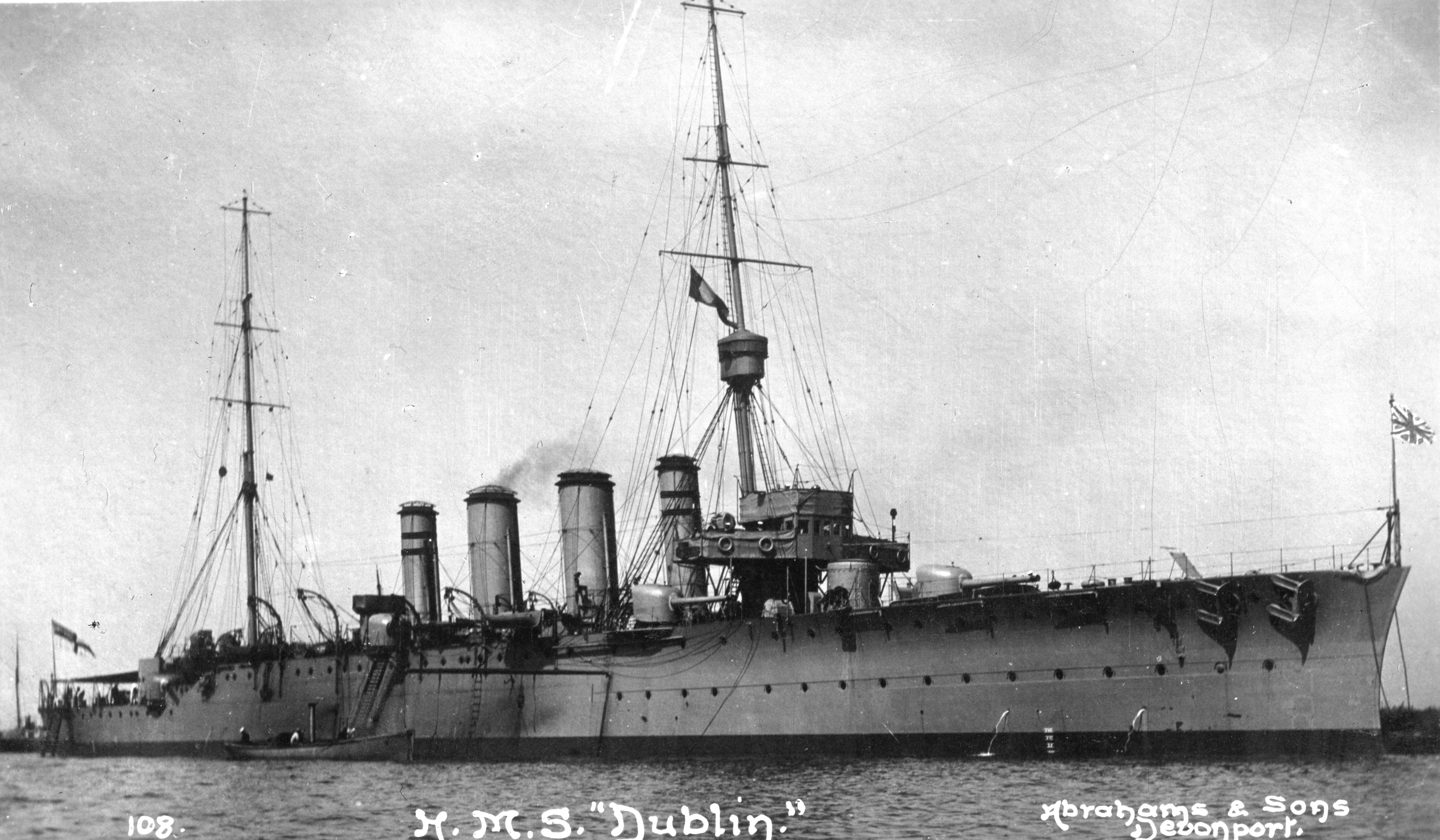
HMS Dublin

The Chatham subclass (Note: Also known as the Melbourne, Dublin, or Southampton subclass.) of six ships, three for the Royal Navy and three for Australia (of which one was to be built in Australia) were ordered under the 1910–1911 Programme. The five British-built ships commissioned between 1912 and 1913, while Brisbane, the Australian-built ship was laid down in 1913 and completed in 1916. The major difference between the Chathams and the earlier Towns was a revised armour scheme. While the earlier ships were protected cruisers, depending on an armoured deck deep within the ship to protect machinery and magazines, the Chathams relied on a vertical belt of armour.

The Chathams were 458 feet (139.6 m) long overall, with a beam of 49 feet (14.9 m) and a draught of 16 feet (4.9 m). Displacement was 5,400 long tons (5,500 t) normal and 6,000 long tons (6,100 t) full load. The belt consisted of 2-inch (51 mm) of nickel-steel on top of 1-inch (25 mm) of high-tensile steel, tapering from 3–2 1/2-inch (76–64 mm) forward and to 2-inch (51 mm) aft. It covered from 8.25–10.5 feet (2.51–3.20 m) above the waterline to 2.5 feet (0.76 m) below it. This belt was part of the load bearing structure of the ship, reducing the overall weight of structure required. A thin armoured deck, 3/8 inch (9.5 mm) over most of its length and 1 1/2 inches (38 mm) over the steering gear, was retained, mainly as a watertight deck. The ships' forecastle was again extended aft, reaching two-thirds of the length of the ship, and allowing two more guns to be raised up onto the forecastle, while the ships' metacentric height was reduced, making the ships better gun platforms. Officer's accommodation was moved back to the rear of the ships in this class. Machinery layout was again similar to the earlier Towns, with one ship, Southampton, having a two-shaft layout. It was rated at 25,000 shaft horsepower (19,000 kW) giving a speed of 25.5 knots (47.2 km/h; 29.3 mph).

While main armament again consisted of eight 6 in guns in single mountings, a new gun, the BL 6 inch Mk XII was used. This was shorter and lighter than the Mk XI guns used in earlier ships, and while range was slightly less (14,000 yards (13,000 m) compared to 14,600 yards (13,400 m)), they were much easier to handle in rough weather and were more accurate. They had larger magazines, giving up to 200 rounds per gun rather than 150 in earlier ships. The remaining armament was unchanged.

Wartime changes were similar to those made to the Weymouths, with a 3-inch anti-aircraft gun fitted during 1915 and director control with its associated tripod mast fitted later in the war. Four of the ships (Dublin, Southampton, Melbourne and Sydney) were fitted for platforms for operating aircraft.

=== Birmingham subclass ===
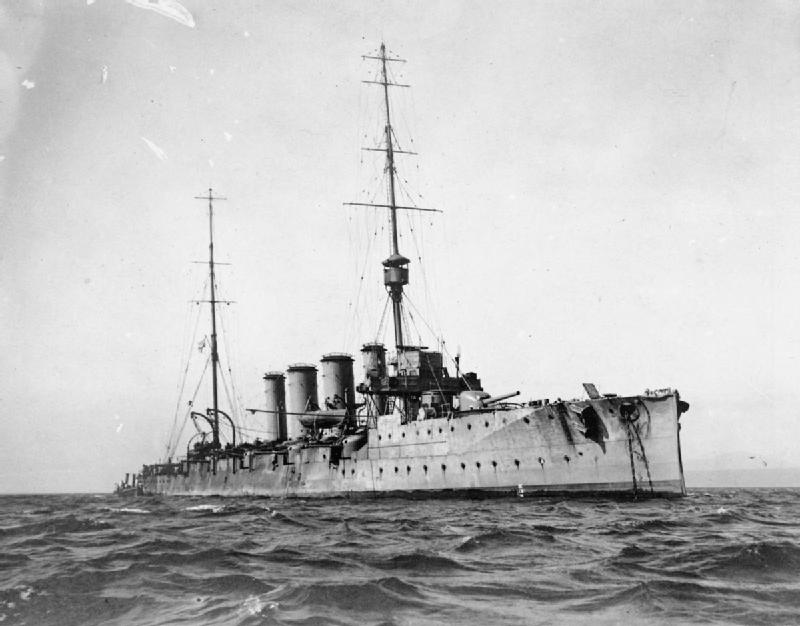
HMS Glasgow at Valparaíso, Chile, before the Battle of Coronel, 1 November 1914

The 1911–1912 Programme brought the Birmingham subclass. Three ships were ordered for the Royal Navy, commissioning in 1914. A fourth, similar, ship, Adelaide, was built in Sydney for Australia. The First World War caused the construction of Adelaide, which was reliant on materials and parts from the United Kingdom, to be heavily delayed, with Adelaide not completing until 1922. They were closely based on the Chatham subclass but with a revised armament. While in theory, three guns could fire forwards in the previous arrangement (the forward centreline gun and the forward two waist guns), in practice the effects of blast from the waist guns on the bridge and conning tower prevented this. The solution was to mount two guns side-by side on the forecastle, forward of the bridge, giving a total armament of nine BL 6 inch Mk XII guns. The remainder of the armament was unchanged (i.e. four 3-pounder saluting guns and two submerged 21-inch torpedo tubes).

The ships were 457 feet (139.3 m) long overall (Adelaide was 462 feet 9 inches (141.05 m) long), with a beam of 50 feet (15.2 m) and a draught of 16 feet (4.9 m). They displaced 5,440 long tons (5,530 t) normal and 6,040 long tons (6,140 t) deep load (Adelaide displaced 5,550 long tons (5,640 t) normal and 6,160 long tons (6,260 t) deep load). The ships' forecastle had increased flare to reduce spray. The ships' machinery (Note: Sources differ as to the layout of the machinery. Preston says that the Birminghams were four-shaft ships, while Lyon says that they were two-shaft ships, with Parsons turbines. Jane's Fighting Ships 1931 and Whitley say that Adelaide had two shafts, while Brook says that Birmingham also had two-shaft machinery.) was rated at 25,000 shaft horsepower (19,000 kW) giving a speed of 25.5 knots (47.2 km/h; 29.3 mph).

A 3-inch anti-aircraft gun was fitted in 1915, while Lowestoft and Birmingham were fitted with director control. (Nottingham was lost before it could be fitted). Adelaide was completed with these modifications, and received a major refit in the 1930s, with coal-fired boilers being removed along with a funnel, reducing the ship's speed, while one 6-inch was removed, with 4-inch anti-aircraft guns added. She was subject to further armament revisions during the Second World War, with more 6- and 4-inch guns removed to accommodate depth charge throwers, and radar being fitted.

=== Further developments: Atlantic cruisers and Hawkins class ===
In 1912, work began on a new cruiser for trade protection duties in response to rumours of large German cruisers that were thought to being built for commerce raiding. A series of designs were drawn up for what became known as the "Atlantic cruiser", featuring various combinations of 7.5-inch (190 mm) and 6-inch guns, mixed oil- and coal-fired boilers and speeds of between 26 knots (48 km/h; 30 mph) and 28 knots (52 km/h; 32 mph). When the rumoured German ships proved to be false, the Atlantic cruiser was abandoned.

In 1915, as a response to German commerce raiding in the early months of the war, the British Admiralty decided to build a new class of large, fast and heavily armed cruisers for trade protection work. Again, a mixed armament of 7.5 in and 6 in guns were chosen, with mixed oil- and coal-fired boilers in order to aid operations in distant waters where oil supplies would be limited. The new design became known as the "Improved Birmingham" class or Hawkins class, with five being built, completing between 1918 and 1925. Later, with the advent of the 1930 London Naval Treaty, the Hawkins class class would become the Royal Navy's first heavy cruisers.

=== Birkenhead subclass ===
In early 1914, the Greek Navy, in response to Turkish naval expansion, placed an order with the Coventry Syndicate, a consortium of the shipbuilders Cammell Laird, Fairfields, John Brown and the armament company Coventry Ordnance Works, for two light cruisers and four destroyers. (Note: Greece also ordered battleships from Germany and France.) The light cruisers, which were both to be built by Cammell Laird, and to be named Antinavarchos Kountouriotis and Lambros Katsonis, were based on the design of the Chatham and Birmingham subclasses, but with a revised armament to be supplied by the Coventry Ordnance Works.

The new cruisers were 446 feet (135.9 m) long overall, with a beam of 50 feet (15.2 m) and a draught of 16 feet (4.9 m). Displacement was between 5,185 long tons (5,268 t) and 5,235 long tons (5,319 t) normal, and between 5,795 long tons (5,888 t) and 5,845 long tons (5,939 t) deep load. Armour was as fitted to the Chathams. Machinery was also as in the Chathams. The first ship, later to become Birkenhead, had the same mixed oil-and coal-fired boilers, with the machinery rated at 25,000 shaft horsepower (19,000 kW) with a speed of 25.5 knots (47.2 km/h; 29.3 mph), but the second ship (later Chester) had all oil-fired boilers, which boosted power to 31,000 shaft horsepower (23,000 kW) and speed to 26.5 knots (49.1 km/h; 30.5 mph). The ships' main armament was ten QF 5.5 in (140 mm) Mark I guns (50 calibres long) to a new design by Coventry Ordnance Works. The guns fired an 82-pound (37 kg) shell to a range of 13,100 yards (12,000 m). The lighter shell was easier to handle, and gave a greater rate of fire. It was planned to fit the ships with two 12-pounder 76 mm (3.0 in) (76 mm) anti-aircraft guns, while two 21-inch torpedo tubes were fitted.

Work continued on the two ships for the Greeks after the outbreak of the First World War, but early in 1915, (Note: The British requisition of the order took place sometime after 18 January 1915, when the first ship, Antinavarchos Kountouriotis, was launched.) with no sign of an end to the war, the British Admiralty took over the contract for the two ships, which became the Birkenhead subclass, together with the 5.5-inch guns and ammunition. The ships' main armament was kept by the Royal Navy, and proved to be successful in service, with the 5.5 in gun being selected as secondary armament for the battlecruisers HMS Hood and HMS Furious and the aircraft carrier HMS Hermes. The 12-pounder 76 mm (3.0 in) anti-aircraft guns were unavailable, however, and Vickers 3-pounder guns were fitted in their place.

After the war, they were offered for sale back to the Greeks, but this offer was not taken up.

== Ships ==
Construction data
Ship	Builder	Laid down	Launched	Commissioned	Fate
Bristol subclass
Bristol	John Brown, Clydebank	23 March 1909	23 February 1910	17 December 1910	Sold for breaking up 9 May 1921 to Thos. W. Ward, Hayle.
Glasgow	Fairfield Shipbuilding, Govan	25 March 1909	30 September 1909	19 September 1910	Sold for breaking up 29 April 1927 to Thos. W. Ward, Morecambe.
Gloucester	William Beardmore, Dalmuir	15 April 1909	28 October 1909	October 1910	Sold for breaking up to Thos. W. Ward, Briton Ferry, 9 May 1921.
Liverpool	Vickers, Barrow-in-Furness	17 February 1909	30 October 1909	4 October 1910	Sold for scrap 8 November 1921. Broken up in Germany.
Newcastle	Armstrong Whitworth, Elswick	14 April 1909	25 November 1909	20 September 1910	Sold for scrap to Thos. W. Ward, Lelant, 9 May 1921.
Weymouth subclass
Weymouth	Armstrong Whitworth, Elswick	19 January 1910	18 November 1910	October 1911	Sold for breaking up to Hughes Bolckow, Blyth, 2 October 1928.
Yarmouth	London & Glasgow Shipbuilding, Govan	27 January 1910	12 April 1911	April 1912	Sold for breaking up 2 July 1929 to Alloa Ship Breaking Company, Rosyth.
Dartmouth	Vickers, Barrow-in-Furness	19 February 1910	14 December 1910 (Note: While Preston and Dittmar and Colledge state that Dartmouth was launched on 14 December, Lyon states 13 February 1911.)	October 1911	Sold for breaking up 13 December 1930 to Alloa, Rosyth.
Falmouth	William Beardmore, Dalmuir	21 February 1910	20 September 1910	September 1911	Torpedoed by German submarine U-66 in the North Sea and damaged 19 August 1916, then torpedoed by German submarine U-63 the next day and sunk off Flamborough Head.
Chatham subclass
Royal Navy
Chatham	HM Dockyard, Chatham	3 January 1911	9 November 1911	December 1912	Transferred to the New Zealand Navy 11 September 1920, but returned to Royal Navy 1924. Sold for breaking up to Thos. W. Ward, Pembroke Dock, 13 July 1926.
Dublin	William Beardmore, Dalmuir	3 January 1911	9 November 1911 (Note: While Lyon and Preston have Dublin launched on 9 November 1911, Dittmar and Colledge and Colledge say she was launched on 30 April 1912.)	March 1913	Sold for breaking up to King, Troon, July 1926.
Southampton	John Brown, Clydebank	6 April 1911	16 May 1912	November 1912	Sold for breaking up to Thos. W. Ward, Pembroke Dock, 13 July 1926.
Royal Australian Navy
Sydney	London & Glasgow, Govan	11 February 1911	29 August 1912	26 June 1913	Broken up at Cockatoo Island, April 1929.
Melbourne	Cammell Laird, Birkenhead	14 April 1911	30 May 1912	January 1913	Sold for breaking up 8 December 1928 to Alloa, Rosyth.
Brisbane	HMA Dockyard, Cockatoo Island	25 January 1913	30 September 1915	October 1916	Sold for breaking up 13 June 1936 to Thos. W. Ward, Briton Ferry.
Birmingham subclass
Royal Navy
Birmingham	Armstrong Whitworth, Elswick	10 June 1912	7 May 1913	3 February 1914	Sold for breaking up 5 February 1931 to Thos. W. Ward, Pembroke Dock.
Lowestoft	HM Dockyard, Chatham	29 July 1912	28 April 1913 (Note: Lyon and Preston state 28 April, while Dittmar and Colledge and Colledge state 23 April.)	21 April 1914	Sold for breaking up 8 January 1931 to Thos. W. Ward, Milford Haven.
Nottingham	HM Dockyard, Pembroke Dock	13 June 1912	18 April 1913	1 April 1914	Torpedoed three times by German submarine U-52 in the North Sea 19 August 1916 and sunk with 38 dead.
Royal Australian Navy
Adelaide	HMA Dockyard, Cockatoo Island	20 November 1915	27 July 1918	4 August 1922	Sold for breaking up to Australian Iron and Steel Co., Port Kembla, New South Wales, January 1949
Birkenhead subclass
Birkenhead (ex-Antinavarchos Kountouriotis)	Cammell Laird, Birkenhead	27 March 1914	18 January 1915	May 1915	Sold for scrapping to Cashmore, Newport, Wales, 26 October 1921.
Chester (ex-Lambros Katsonis)	Cammell Laird, Birkenhead	7 October 1914	8 December 1915	May 1916	Sold for scrapping to Rees, Llanelly, 9 November 1921.
Ship	Builder	Laid down	Launched	Commissioned	Fate

== Operational service ==
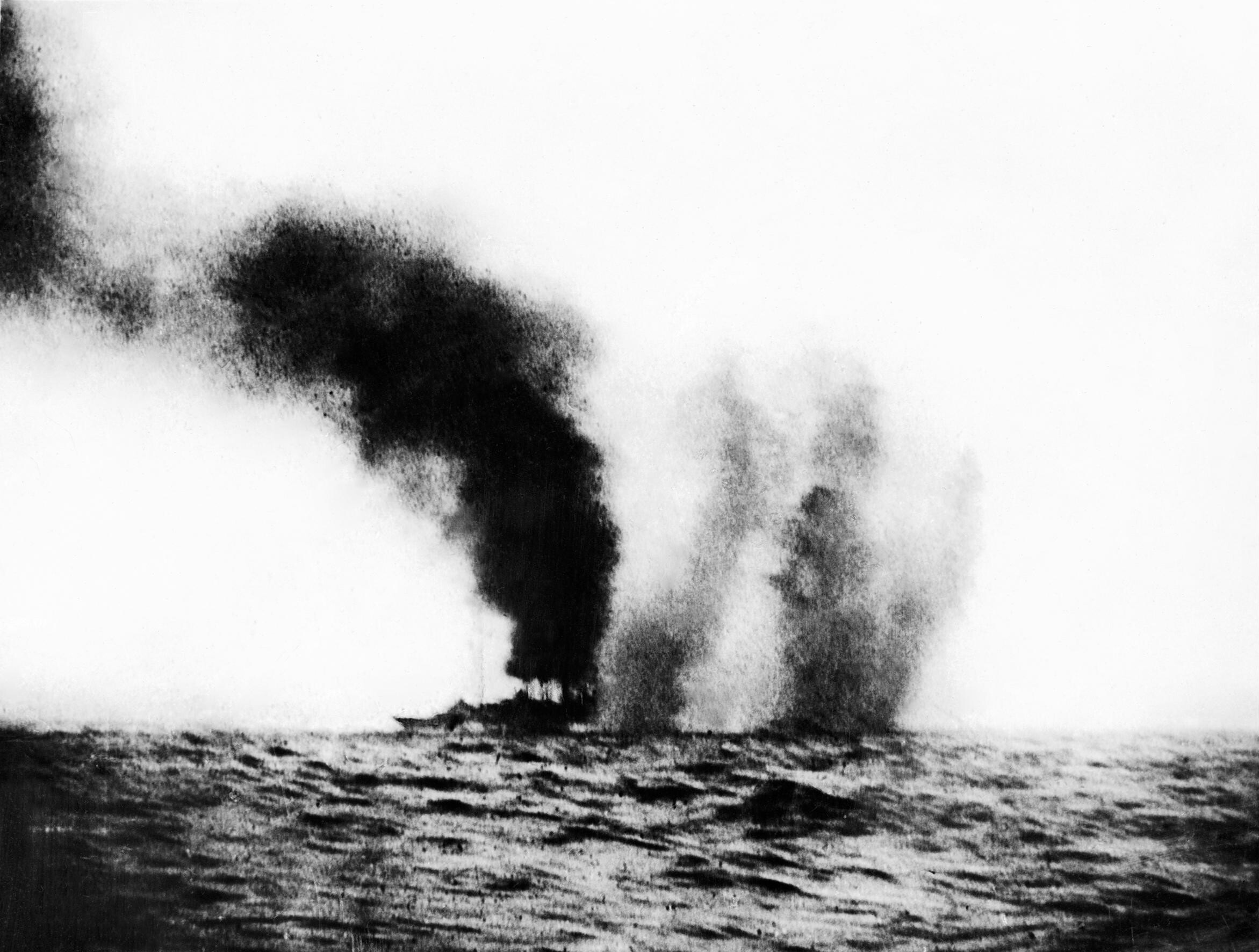
HMS Birmingham under fire at the Battle of Jutland

The class saw much service in the First World War and many of the ships left their mark on history. Ships of the class saw action at the Battles of Coronel, the Battle of the Falkland Islands and the Battle of Heligoland Bight in 1914. That same year, Sydney attacked SMS Emden in an action that lasted over an hour and resulted in the German warship being beached by her captain to avoid his ship sinking. Also that year, Birmingham became the first ship to sink a submarine when she rammed the German submarine U-15 on 9 August.

In 1915, HMS Glasgow found SMS Dresden, which had escaped from the engagement at the Falkland Islands the previous year, in which Glasgow had helped in sinking SMS Leipzig. Dresden was eventually scuttled by her own crew after a short engagement. Ships of the class also took part in the Battle of Dogger Bank in 1915.

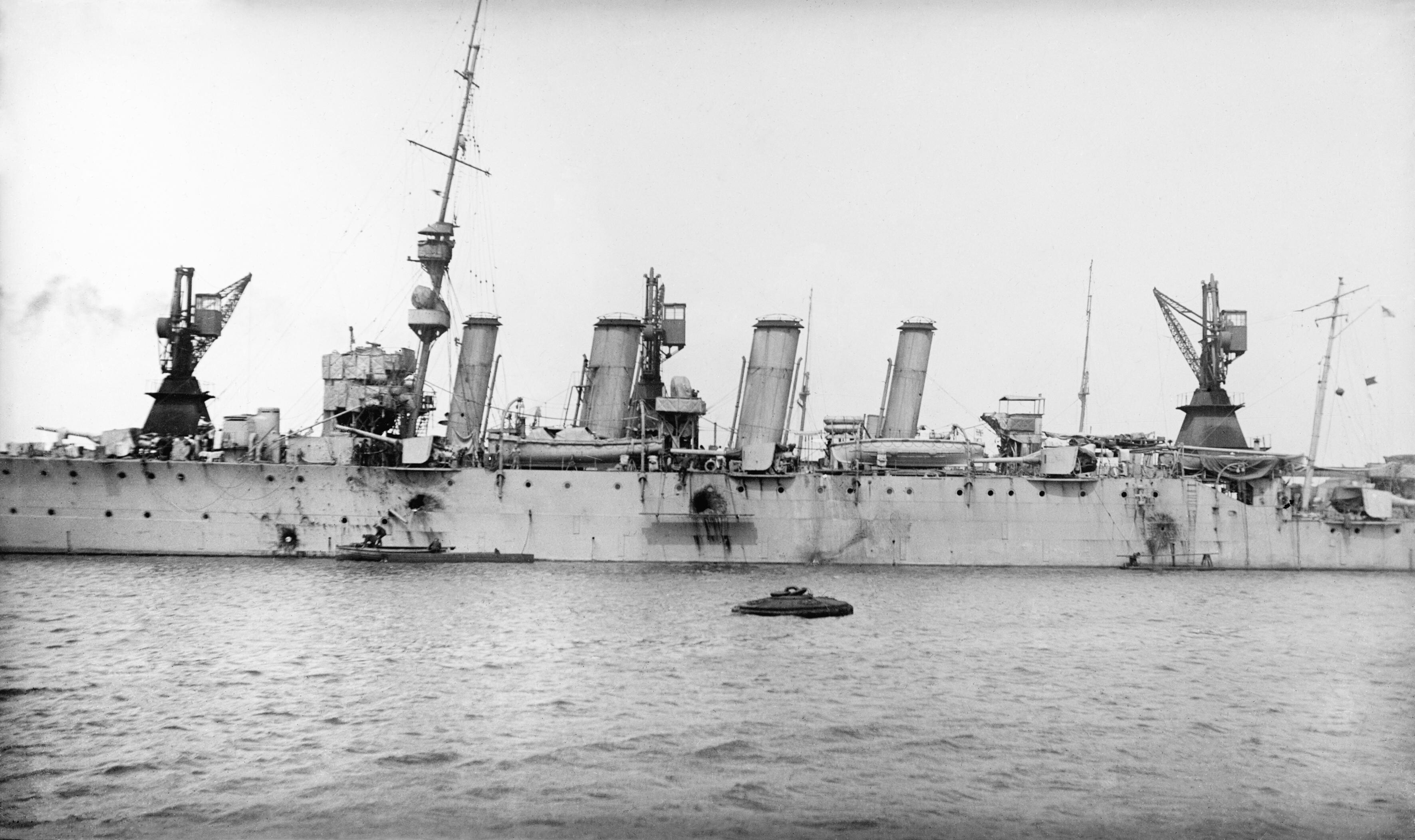
HMS Chester, showing damage sustained at the Battle of Jutland, 31 May 1916

In 1916, ships of the class also saw action at the Battle of Jutland, the largest surface engagement of the First World War . In 1917, a Sopwith Pup from HMS Yarmouth became the first aircraft from a cruiser to shoot down an aircraft, specifically the Zeppelin L23. The ships of the class saw more service than mentioned above, including action against German merchant ships. During the course of the war, two ships of the class were sunk: these were HMS Falmouth and HMS Nottingham, both torpedoed by German submarines.

After the end of the First World War, the surviving ships performed a variety of duties, including service on foreign stations. All ships, except Adelaide, were scrapped by the 1930s. Adelaide saw an extensive refit between 1938 and 1939. However, Adelaide was obsolete when the Second World War began, and she saw limited service, performing patrol and escort duties in the Pacific and Indian Oceans. She was decommissioned in 1945, but recommissioned to become a tender at Sydney. She was broken up in 1949.
