= 3rd Light Cruiser Squadron =

- Active: 1915–1922
- Country: United Kingdom
- Allegiance: British Empire
- Branch: Royal Navy
- Engagements: Battle of Jutland

The 3rd Light Cruiser Squadron was a naval formation of light cruisers of the Royal Navy from 1915 to 1922.

== History ==
=== World War One ===
Formed in 1915, it was part of the Grand Fleet, the squadron fought at the Battle of Jutland. The squadron was attached to Battle Cruiser Fleet from February 1915 until November 1916 when that formation was renamed Battle Cruiser Force, it remained attached to BC Force until February 1919.

=== Interwar years ===
In April 1919 the squadron was detached to the Mediterranean Fleet. In December 1922 the squadron was re-designated the 3rd Cruiser Squadron.

== Rear/Vice-Admirals commanding ==
Post holders included:

	Rank	Flag	Name	Term
Rear-Admiral/Vice-Admiral Commanding, 3rd Light Cruiser Squadron
1	Rear-Admiral	Rear-Admiral - Royal Navy	Trevylyan D. W. Napier	8 February 1915 – 30 July 1917
2	Rear-Admiral	Rear-Admiral - Royal Navy	Allen T. Hunt	1 January 1918 – 1 February 1919
3	Rear-Admiral	Rear-Admiral - Royal Navy	Sir Edwyn Alexander-Sinclair	1 February 1919 – 5 August 1919
4	Vice-Admiral	Vice-Admiral - Royal Navy	Sir George P.W. Hope	15 August 1919 – 19 January 1921
5	Rear-Admiral	Rear-Admiral - Royal Navy	Sir Reginald Tyrwhitt	19 January 1921 – 11 December 1922

== Deployments ==
Distribution of the squadron included:

	Assigned to	Date	Notes
1	Grand Fleet	08/1914-10/1915	
2	Battle Cruiser Fleet	11/1915-11/1916	as part of the Grand Fleet
3	Battle Cruiser Force	11/1916-10/1918	as part of the Grand Fleet
4	Home Fleet	10-1918-03/1919	
5	Mediterranean Fleet	04/1919-12/1922	
6	Mediterranean Fleet	12/1922	redesignated 3rd Cruiser Squadron
