= 2nd Light Cruiser Squadron =

- Active: 1913–1925
- Country: United Kingdom
- Allegiance: British Empire
- Branch: Royal Navy
- Engagements: Battle of Jutland

The 2nd Light Cruiser Squadron was a naval formation of light cruisers of the Royal Navy from 1914 to 1925.

== History ==
=== World War One ===
Originally part of the Grand Fleet, the squadron fought at the Battle of Jutland, where it was commanded by William Goodenough and consisted of Southampton (flagship), Birmingham, Nottingham and Dublin.

Following the battle, the squadron undertook patrol duties in the North Sea. Later in 1916, the Australian cruisers HMAS Melbourne and HMAS Sydney joined the squadron. It which saw action against German airships and light aircraft during 1917 and 1918.

The squadron was attached to Battle Cruiser Fleet from January 1915 until November 1916 when that formation was renamed Battle Cruiser Force it remained attached BC Force until February 1919. The Squadron was then disbanded for two months before reforming as part of the Home Fleet it was assigned to screening duties of the Third Battle Squadron until July 1919. It remained attached to the Home Fleet until October 1919 when it was transferred to the Atlantic Fleet. In 1925 it was re-designated 2nd Cruiser Squadron.

== Commodores/Rear-Admirals commanding ==
Post holders included:

	Rank	Flag	Name	Term
Commodore/Rear-Admiral, Commanding 2nd Light Cruiser Squadron
1	Commodore, 2nd Class		Trevylyan D. W. Napier	1 July, 1913 – 1 December, 1913
2	Rear-Admiral	Rear-Admiral - Royal Navy	Trevylyan D. W. Napier	28 December, 1914 – 8 February, 1915
3	Commodore, 1st Class		Cecil F. Lambert	25 December, 1916 – 23 February, 1918
4	Rear-Admiral	Rear-Admiral - Royal Navy	James A. Fergusson	9 May, 1918
5	Rear-Admiral	Rear-Admiral - Royal Navy	Alexander Duff	14 May, 1919
6	Rear-Admiral	Rear-Admiral - Royal Navy	Wilmot S. Nicholson	14 May, 1921 – 15 May, 1923
7	Rear-Admiral	Rear-Admiral - Royal Navy	Thomas D. Gilbert	15 May, 1923 – 15 May, 1925

== Deployments ==
Distribution of the squadron included:

	Assigned to	Date	Notes
1	Grand Fleet	08/1914 – 01/1915	
2	Battle Cruiser Fleet	01/1915 – 11/1916	as part of the Grand Fleet
3	Battle Cruiser Force	11/1916 – 02/1919	as part of the Grand Fleet
4	Home Fleet	04-1919 – 10/1919	on protection duties 3rd Battle Squadron
5	Atlantic Fleet	11/1919 – 05/1925	
6	Home Fleet	05/1925	renamed 2nd Cruiser Squadron
