= BL 6-inch Mk XI naval gun =

British 50 calibre high-velocity naval gun

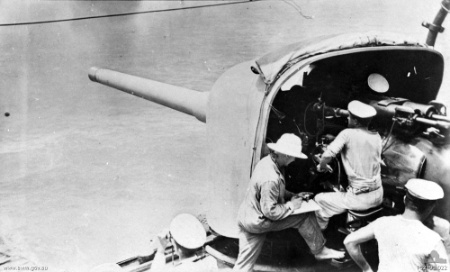
- Gunnery exercise on HMAS Melbourne circa. 1913
- Type: Naval gun Coast defence gun
- Place of origin: United Kingdom

Service history
- In service: 1906 – 1957
- Wars: World War I World War II

Production history
- No. built: 177
- Variants: Mk XI

Specifications
- Mass: 19,237 lbs (8,726 kg)
- Barrel length: 300 inches (7.620 m) bore (50 cal)
- Shell: 100 pounds (45.36 kg) Lyddite, Armour-piercing, Shrapnel
- Calibre: 6 inches (152.4 mm)
- Muzzle velocity: 2,900 feet per second (884 m/s)
- Maximum firing range: 18,000 yards (16,000 m) @ 22.5°

The BL 6-inch Mark XI naval gun was a British 50 calibres high-velocity naval gun which was mounted as primary armament on cruisers and secondary armament on pre-dreadnought battleships from 1906 onwards.

== History ==
The gun with its increased length of 50 calibres gave improved firepower over the current 6-inch Mk VII gun of 45 calibres. However, its increased length and weight made it unwieldy in the current manually operated shipboard mountings on light cruisers, which did not provide a steady platform. Britain reverted to 45-calibres guns in new warships from 1914 onwards with the BL 6-inch Mk XII gun. Of the 177 produced 126 remained for Royal Navy use in 1939.

== Naval gun ==
Guns were mounted in the following ships :

- The last three King Edward VII-class battleships Britannia, Africa and Hibernia laid down 1902–1904
- Armoured cruisers: HMS Duke of Edinburgh and Black Prince laid down 1903
- Bristol-class light cruisers laid down 1909
- Weymouth-class cruisers laid down 1910
- Chatham-class light cruisers laid down 1911
- Birmingham-class light cruisers laid down 1912
- Monitor HMS Marshal Ney as re-gunned in 1918

== Coast defence gun ==
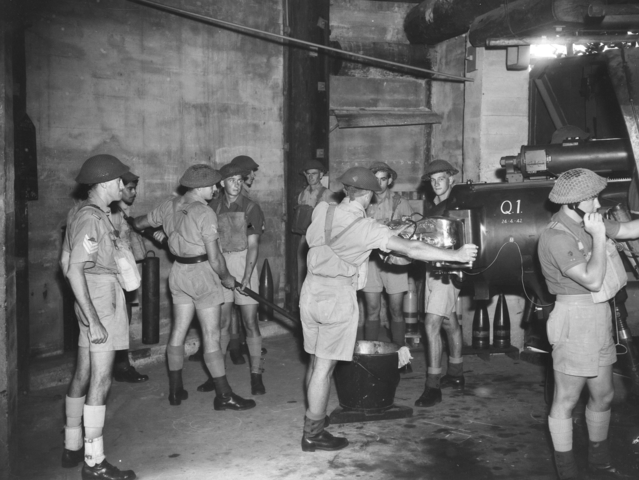
Gun and crew at Fort Cowan, Brisbane, November 1943.

The Mk XI gun was emplaced for coast defence in South Africa and particularly in Australia leading up to World War II, and remained in service until the 1950s. Guns in Australia came from the decommissioned World War I cruisers HMAS Sydney, HMAS Melbourne and HMAS Brisbane and were emplaced in northern Australia and Torres Strait to defend against possible attack by Japan, and on Rottnest Island WA, Brisbane and the Sydney harbour and Port Kembla defences.

== See also ==
- List of naval guns

=== Weapons of comparable role, performance and era ===
- 15 cm/50 41st Year Type : Imperial Japanese Navy equivalent gun
- 6"/50 caliber gun : US equivalent

== Surviving examples ==
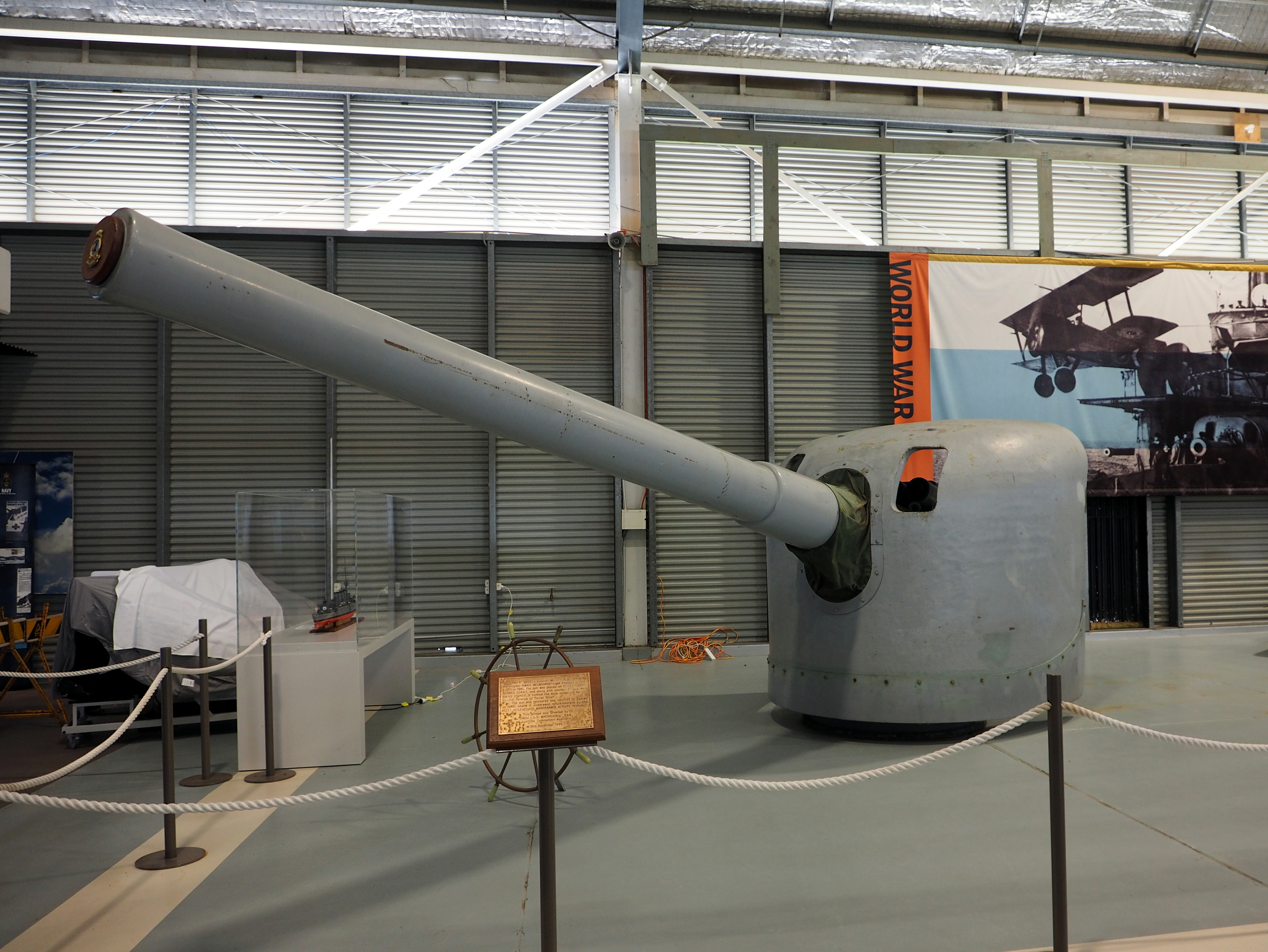
One of HMAS Melbourne's guns on display in 2015

- RGF gun No. 2035 of 1905, and 1 other gun at Malgaskop, Saldanha Bay, South Africa
- VSM gun No. 2305 of 1912 formerly at Port Wakefield Proof Range, north of Adelaide, and since 2006 at B42 gun emplacement at Lower Georges Heights, Sydney Australia
- A coast defence gun at East Point Military museum, Darwin, Australia
- One of the HMAS Sydney guns at Leighton Battery, Fremantle, Western Australia
- One of HMAS Melbourne's guns at the Fleet Air Arm Museum, Nowra, NSW, Australia

== Sources ==
- David Spethman, "The Garrison Guns of Australia 1788 – 1962", published by Ron H Mortensen, Inala QLD 2008. ISBN 978-0-9775990-8-0
- Campbell, John (1985). Naval Weapons of World War Two. Naval Institute Press. ISBN 0-87021-459-4.
