= QF 3-pounder Vickers =

Ordnance QF 3-pounder Vickers
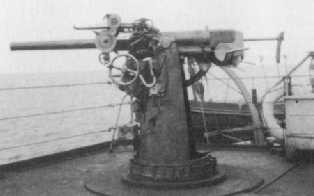
- On a Royal Navy monitor circa. 1918
- Type: Naval gun, Anti-aircraft gun
- Place of origin: United Kingdom

Service history
- In service: 1905–1940
- Used by: United Kingdom; Ottoman Empire
- Wars: World War I, World War II

Production history
- Designer: Vickers
- Designed: 1902–03
- Manufacturer: Vickers
- Produced: 1905–?
- No. built: 600
- Variants: Mk I Mk II

Specifications
- Mass: 1,323 lb (600 kg) in total
- Barrel length: 8 ft 8 in (2.64 m) bore (50 calibres)
- Shell: 47×360mmR 3.3 lb (1.50 kg) shell.
- Calibre: 47 mm (1.85 in)
- Breech: semi-automatic vertical block
- Carriage: three-leg platform
- Elevation: −5° to +12°
- Traverse: 360°
- Rate of fire: 20 rounds per minute
- Muzzle velocity: 2,575 ft/s (785 m/s) (HE)
- Effective firing range: 2,000 yd (1,829 m)(AA)
- Maximum firing range: 5,600 yd (5,100 m) at 12° elevation; 15,000 ft (4,600 m) (AA ceiling)
- Sights: telescopic

The Ordnance QF 3-pounder Vickers (47 mm / L50) was a British artillery piece first tested in Britain in 1903. It was used on Royal Navy warships. It was more powerful than and unrelated to the older QF 3-pounder Hotchkiss, with a propellant charge approximately twice as large, but it initially fired the same Lyddite and steel shells as the Hotchkiss.

== Development ==
Starting in 1904, the Royal Navy bought over 154 of these for use as anti-torpedo boat weapons on capital ships and to arm smaller ships. British production of these guns started in 1905 at Vickers and by the time production stopped in 1936 a total of 600 weapons had been made.

== Royal Navy use ==
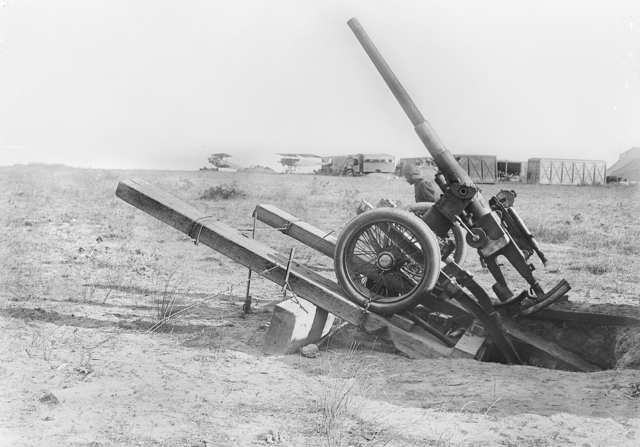
RNAS gun on improvised anti-aircraft mounting, Tenedos, Dardanelles, 1915. Photo by Ernest Brooks.

By 1911 about 193 guns of this type were in service, and they became standard equipment in the Royal Navy until 1915. In that year, service during the First World War proved these weapons to be ineffective and they were quickly removed from most of the larger ships, some were mounted in armoured lorries as the main armaments of the Pierce-Arrow and Seabrook armoured lorries. During the interwar years they were widely used to arm light ships and river craft. A number of them were converted into anti-aircraft guns and by 1927 at least 62 guns had been converted.

== See also ==
- QF 3-pounder Hotchkiss: this gun's predecessor
- OQF 3-pounder gun: tank gun based on the Ordnance QF 3-pounder Vickers
- List of naval guns
