= Shipping of the Midland Railway =

The Midland Railway (MR) operated ships from Heysham to Douglas and Belfast.

Ship	Launched	Tonnage (GRT)	Notes and references
SS Antrim	1904	2,100	Built by John Brown & Company at Clydebank, the first of a series of four similar ships. She was the first vessel to use the new facilities at Heysham and made her maiden voyage in September 1904. She was the first cross-channel ship with wireless. Requisitioned between 1914 and 1919, used mainly for cross channel trooping. Transferred to London, Midland and Scottish Railway (LMS). Sold in 1928 to the Isle of Man Steam Packet Company and renamed Ramsey Town. Scrapped at Preston in November 1936.
SS City of Belfast	1893	1,055	Built by Laird Bros. of Birkenhead. Bought from Barrow Steam Navigation Company in 1907. In war service named HMS City of Belfast. Transferred to LMS in 1923. Sold in 1925 to a Greek owner, renamed Nicolaos Togias. Renamed Kephallina in 1933. Sank on 13 August 1941 off the Egyptian coast.
SS Donegal	1904	1,997	A sister of Antrim built by Caird & Company of Greenock. Requisitioned during the First World War as a hospital ship. Torpedoed and sunk on 17 April 1917 near Spithead.
PS Duchess of Buccleuch	1888	838	Built by Fairfield Shipbuilding and Engineering Company at Govan for the London, Brighton and South Coast Railway and named Rouen. Sold to J. W. and R. P. Little for the Barrow S. N. Company and renamed Duchess of Buccleuch. Served the Barrow-Douglas route. Absorbed into MR fleet with the takeover of 1907. Sold for scrapping in 1909, the final paddler on the Barrow route.
SS Duchess of Devonshire	1897	1,265	Built by Naval & Armament Construction Co., at Barrow for James Little and the Barrow S. N. Company. Taken over by MR in 1907. Requisitioned for war service and used as an armed boarding vessel. Suffered a boiler explosion in 1919 that killed three people. Sold in 1928 to Bland Line, Gibraltar, renamed Gibel Dersa and requisitioned again in 1940 based principally at Gibraltar as an accommodation ship. Sold on to Dalhousie Steam and Motor Ship Co. of London in 1943 and in 1947 to A. Benamin and Co. of Gibraltar. After nine years of inactivity was scrapped in 1949 at Málaga, Spain.
SS Londonderry	1904	2,086	Built by William Denny and Brothers of Dumbarton, the first ship with Lodge-Muirhead wireless telegraphy. Requisitioned for trooping in 1914 and in 1923 transferred to the LMS. Sold in 1927 to Angleterre-Lorraine-Alsace, renamed Flamand. Scrapped at Altenwerder, Germany in 1937.
SS Manxman	1904	2,174	Built by Vickers, Sons and Maxim Ltd of Barrow-in-Furness. Similar in design to the other 1904 built vessels but slightly longer and faster. Requisitioned in 1914 for trooping and purchased in 1915 by the Admiralty as HMS Manxman and converted to an aircraft carrier. Returned to MR in 1919. Sold to the Isle of Man Steam Packet Company in 1920 and converted to oil burning in 1921. Requisitioned by as HMS Caduceus. Transferred to Ministry of War Transport in 1945 and worked as a troop carrier in the English Channel. Transferred to British Army of the Rhine (B.A.O.R.) military service as Manxman, carrying troops on the Harwich-Hook of Holland service. Withdrawn in February 1949, no longer fit for use, scrapped in August 1949 at Preston.
PS Manx Queen	1880	989	Built by J. & G. Thomson Ltd of Glasgow for the South Eastern Railway as the Duchess of Edinburgh. On delivery she failed to perform at the contracted design speed and after a short time in service was returned to her builders. She re-entered service in May 1841 following a compromise agreement between the builder and owner but after only five days in service she broke a paddle wheel, resulting in the owners returning her again to her builders. Laid up at Folkestone and later Sheerness until purchased by Barrow S .N. Co., which placed her on the Barrow-Douglas service. Renamed Manx Queen in 1887 and transferred to MR following the takeover of Barrow S. N. Co. Scrapped by J. J. King and Company at Garston in November 1907.
SS Wyvern	1905	232	Built as a tug by Ferguson Bros. of Port Glasgow. Used for pleasure excursions from Heysham to Fleetwood until the Second World War. Transferred to London, Midland and Scottish Railway(LMS) in 1923 and British Transport Commission- London Midland Region in 1948. Scrapped in June 1960.

== The MR operated vessels for port maintenance ==
Ship	Launched	Tonnage (GRT)	Notes and references
SS Laga	1901	562	Dredger built by J and K Smit of Kinderdijk for K.L.Kalis of Sliedrecht. Purchased by MR in 1905, its first dredger. Transferred to London, Midland and Scottish Railway(LMS) in 1923 and was converted for use as a hopper barge in 1927. Taken over by British Transport Commission(BTC) in 1948 and sold to Abel and Sons of Liverpool in 1958. Scrapped in 1968 at Troon.
SS Hessam	1906	645	Dredger built by Wm. Simons and Co. Ltd. of Renfrew with three Priestman grab cranes. Transferred to LMS and BTC in 1923 and 1948 respectively. Withdrawn in March 1965 and broken up at Silloth the same year.
SS Red Nab	1908	537	Hopper barge built by Wm Simons and Co. Ltd. at Renfrew. Her engines had been constructed on a stand-by basis in 1907 and she was built in 1908 she had slightly smaller dimensions to give her more power. Transferred to LMS and BTC in 1923 and 1948 respectively. Renamed Red Nab ll in 1960 releasing the name to a new build. Scrapped in Dublin in 1961.

The MR owned several small passenger ferries formerly owned by the London, Tilbury and Southend Railway, with which it amalgamated in 1912, on the Gravesend–Tilbury Ferry. Vessels acquired were: Carlotta, Catherine (blt 1903), Edith (1911), Gertrude, Rose (1901) and Tilbury (1883).
