= Francis Martin-Leake =

British royal navy officer

Vice-Admiral Francis Martin-Leake CB DSO
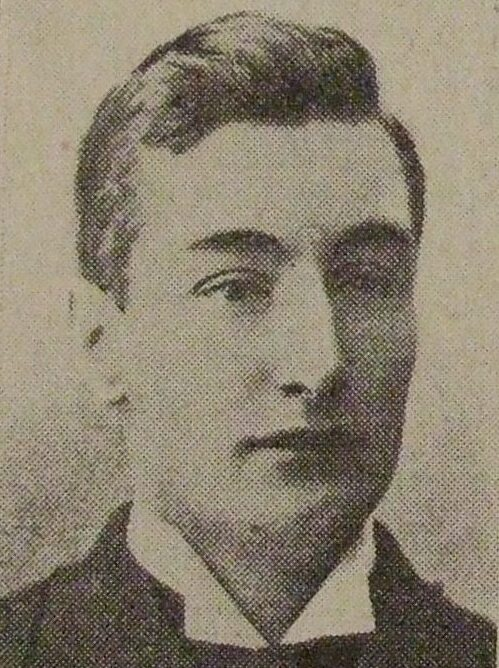
- Born: 16 March 1869; Standon, Hertfordshire, England
- Died: 21 January 1928 (aged 58); Ware, Hertfordshire, England
- Relatives: Arthur Martin-Leake (brother)
- Military career
- Allegiance: United Kingdom
- Branch: Royal Navy
- Service years: 1892–1921
- Rank: Vice-Admiral
- Commands: HMS Amethyst; HMS Pathfinder; HMS Achilles; HMS King George V
- Conflicts: First World War; Action of 16 March 1917

Vice-Admiral Francis Martin-Leake CB DSO (16 March 1869 – 21 January 1928) was a British Royal Navy officer. During the First World War. He commanded HMS Achilles during the Action of 16 March 1917 and managed to sink the SMS Leopard. He also commanded HMS Pathfinder and was a survivor of its sinking on 5 September 1914. Francis was the older brother of Arthur Martin-Leake.

== Early military career ==
Leake joined the Royal Navy and was promoted to Lieutenant on 1 April 1892. He was then promoted to Commander on 31 December 1903 and Captain on 22 June 1911. On 1 January 1913 Leake was appointed captain of HMS Amethyst before being transferred to HMS Pathfinder on 1 October.

== World War I ==
Leake was still commanding HMS Pathfinder when World War I broke out and continued to serve as its commander until the SM U-21 sunk the ship off the Firth of Forth. Leake stayed in the ship as it was sinking but was picked up and saved as he states:

The torpedo got us in our forward magazine and evidently sent this up, thereby killing everyone forward... She (Pathfinder) then fell over and disappeared leaving a mass of wreckage all around, but I regret very few men amongst it, for at the time they were all asleep on the mess decks and the full explosion must have caught them, for no survivors came from forward.

On 6 October he was sent to Portsmouth to serve in HMS Victory and to train up Admiralty M-class destroyers. He then proceeded to command HMS Achilles on 19 February 1915. He was appointed as an additional commander to HMS Royalist on 20 June 1917 as a 2nd Class Commodore of the chief of staff of the Commander-in-Chief of the Coast of Ireland. Lewis Bayly described Leake as "a most exceptional man, for everyone loved the little Commodore". Leake also participated at the Action of 16 March 1917 while commanding HMS Achilles and managed to sink SMS Leopard and killing Korvettenkapitän Hans von Laffert.

== Later years ==
Leake's appointment in Ireland expired on 1 June 1919 and was sent to command HMS King George V as Chief Staff Officer to Vice-Admiral Henry Francis Oliver as Leake was promoted to Vice-Admiral at some point after the war. On 25 May 1920 Leake got himself injured in a motorcycle accident but recovered on 5 August. Leake was placed on the retirement list on 19 November 1921 and died in Ware, Hertfordshire on 21 January 1928 after a three-year battle with dementia paralytica.
