= SMS Leopard =

SMS Leopard may refer to:

- SMS Leopard (1885), an Austro-Hungarian torpedo cruiser launched in 1885 and broken up in 1920
- SMS Leopard (1917), a German auxiliary cruiser sunk in 1917
