= Wyvern (disambiguation) =

A wyvern or wivern is a two-legged dragon often represented in heraldry.

Wyvern or wivern can also refer to:

== Entertainment ==
- Radio Wyvern, a UK radio station now known as Free Radio Herefordshire & Worcestershire
- Wyvern (film), a Sci Fi Pictures original film
- The Wyvern Mystery, a 2000 BBC TV miniseries

== Gaming ==
- Eye of the Wyvern, an adventure module for Dungeons & Dragons
- Wyvern (card game), a collectible card game
- Wyvern (Dungeons & Dragons), wyverns as they appear in the roleplaying game Dungeons & Dragons
- Wyvern (video game), created by Cabochon Technologies

== People ==
- Wyvern, the pen-name of Arthur Robert Kenney-Herbert
- Wyvern Lingo, an Irish band

== Places ==
- Wyvern, Nova Scotia, a community in Canada
- Wyvern Academy, a secondary school in Darlington, County Durham, England
- Wyvern Barracks, a military installation in Exeter, Devon, England
- Wyvern College, the name of two colleges in England
- Wyvern House, a day school in Sydney, New South Wales, Australia
- Wyvern Theatre, in Swindon, Wiltshire, England
- ”Wyvern School”, C.S. Lewis’ pseudonym for Wynyard School, the public school he attended

== Sports ==
- Passlab Yamagata Wyverns, a professional basketball team in Japan
- SK Wyverns, an obsolete team name in Korean professional baseball

== Transportation ==
- HMS Wivern, the name of more than one ship of the British Royal Navy
- TSS Wyvern (1905), a passenger vessel in the United Kingdom
- Vauxhall Wyvern, a four-door saloon car that was manufactured from 1948 to 1957
- Westland Wyvern, a British turboprop fighter aircraft
- Wyvern (1897 vessel), Norwegian sailboat that is part of Stavanger Maritime Museum
- Wyvern Light Car, a defunct British automobile manufacturer
- WyvernRail, a community-owned venture within the Ecclesbourne Valley Railway in Derbyshire, England
- X-02 Wyvern, a fictional plane in the Ace Combat series of video games

== Other ==
- Acianthera wyvern, a species of orchid plant native to Colombia
- Wyvern (programming language), a programming language for mobile and web applications
- Wyvern inc., a Canadian earth observation company.
