= PS Duchess of Edinburgh =

PS Duchess of Edinburgh is the name of the following paddle steamers named for the Duchess of Edinburgh:

- PS Duchess of Edinburgh (1880)
- PS Duchess of Edinburgh (1884)
