= Action of 16 March 1917 =

World War I naval battle

- Part of The First World War
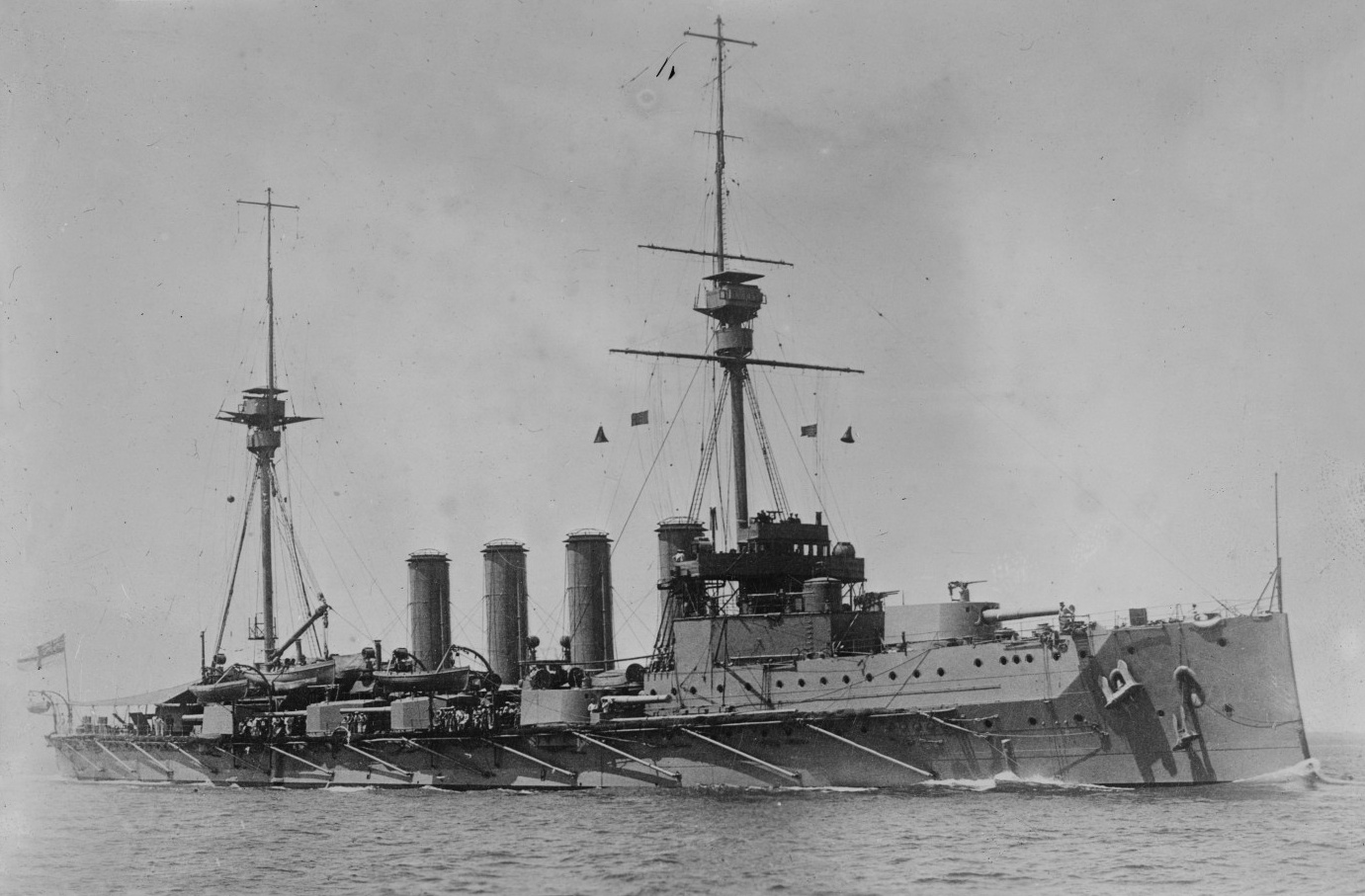
- Achilles
Date	16 March 1917
Location	200 mi (320 km) north-east of the Faroe Islands, in the Norwegian Sea 64°54′N 00°22′E
Result	British victory

Belligerents
United Kingdom	Germany

Commanders and leaders
(United Kingdom) Francis Martin-Leake	(German Empire) Hans von Laffert †

Strength
Armoured cruiser Achilles; 1 armed boarding steamer	Auxiliary cruiser Leopard

Casualties and losses
6 killed	319 killed Leopard sunk
- The battle location in the Norwegian Sea

The Action of 16 March 1917 was a naval engagement in which the British armed boarding steamer SS Dundee and HMS Achilles, a Warrior-class armoured cruiser, fought the German auxiliary cruiser SMS Leopard, which sank with the loss of all 319 hands and six men of a British boarding party.

Leopard was the former British steamer Yarrowdale which had been captured by the German commerce raider Möwe in 1916 and brought back to Germany. The German Imperial Admiralty converted Yarrowdale into a commerce raider, arming it with guns taken from decommissioned ships and fitted two torpedo tubes. The ship was put into service as SMS Leopard and the new captain, Korvettenkapitän Hans von Laffert, sailed in early March 1917 to relieve Möwe.

The British Northern Patrol examined neutral ships entering and leaving the North Sea for contraband cargoes and kept watch for German commerce raiders trying to slip around the north of Scotland into the Atlantic. The German Admiralty warned Laffert that the British had changed their wireless cipher, which stopped them reading of British wireless transmissions to and from the Northern Patrol. Laffert pressed on but on 16 March, Leopard was sunk; Laffert was killed along with his crew and a British boarding party, after a determined attempt to engage the British ships, when caught at a serious disadvantage.

== Background ==
=== SS Yarrowdale ===
The German commerce raider SMS Möwe had set out on its third cruise on 23 November 1916, disguised as a Swedish merchant steamer. Möwe (Fregattenkapitän Nikolaus zu Dohna-Schlodien) had evaded the Northern Patrol, assisted by a rudimentary underwater wireless link to a submarine. It took until 7 December for the British to realise that the ship was at sea and four Armed merchant cruisers of the 10th Cruiser Squadron, supported by the light cruiser HMS Weymouth were detached to search for the ship. Eventually, 24 British and French warships participated in the search. During a four-month voyage, Möwe sank or captured 25 ships of 123,265 gross register tons (GRT). On 11 December, Möwe captured the British steamer SS Yarrowdale (4,652 GRT). Yarrowdale carried 117 vehicles, 30,000 coils of barbed wire, 3,300 long tons (3,400 t) of steel bars and 6,300 boxes of small-arms ammunition. Dohna-Schlodien liked the potential of Yarrowdale as a commerce raider in size, speed [23 kn (43 km/h; 26 mph)], room for a large crew and its "unremarkable-ness". On 13 December, he transferred 469 prisoners (including 89 US citizens) to Yarrowdale and sent the ship with a prize crew to Swinemünde (now Świnoujście).

=== SMS Leopard ===
Under the command of Acting Leutnant Reinhold Badewitz, the ship was sailed to Germany, unwittingly assisted along the way by a strike by Liverpool boilermakers, which contributed to the Northern Patrol being reduced from 23 to six vessels at sea. Yarrowdale slipped past the cordon on 24–25 December 1916 and passed an inspection by a Swedish officer when the ship was sheltering from a gale in Swedish waters. Badewitz bluffed him that the freighter was a coaling ship and entitled to be in Swedish waters, while the prisoners were kept quiet below by being threatened with pistols. Badewitz brought the ship safely home and the prisoners were disembarked on 5 January 1917. The fast, modern ship was ideal for conversion to a commerce raider. Yarrowdale was renamed SMS Leopard on 9 January 1917 and armed with five 150 mm (5.9 in) guns forward and four 88 mm (3.5 in) guns taken from decommissioned ships and hidden behind false doors and shutters, along with four sideways-facing torpedo tubes and room for mines. The ship carried no armour but seven watertight compartments had been installed, increasing its resistance to flooding. The armament meant that Leopard could outgun any ship smaller than a modern cruiser.

Disguised as the Norwegian freighter Rena Norge, Leopard (Korvettenkapitän Hans von Laffert) sailed on 7 March 1917 to relieve Möwe The genuine Rena was off South Africa, having visited Port Natal in late February. The Kaiserliche Admiralität provided a great deal of information to Laffert on the number, dispositions and movements of the Northern Patrol, which had been gleaned from deciphered British wireless messages. Neither side had fully grasped the likelihood that if they could decipher the signals of their opponent, then the opponent was probably doing the same to them. On 7 March, German signals intelligence reported that British patrols between Scotland and Greenland had been reinforced, which was signalled to Laffert, who decided to press on. Leopard passed through the Little Belt of the Kattegat towards the North Sea on 7 March 1917. On 10 March Laffert was informed that the British had changed their cipher and asked to postpone the voyage unless circumstances changed; Laffert replied "Have received telegram, long live the Emperor" and continued the voyage.

=== Northern Patrol ===
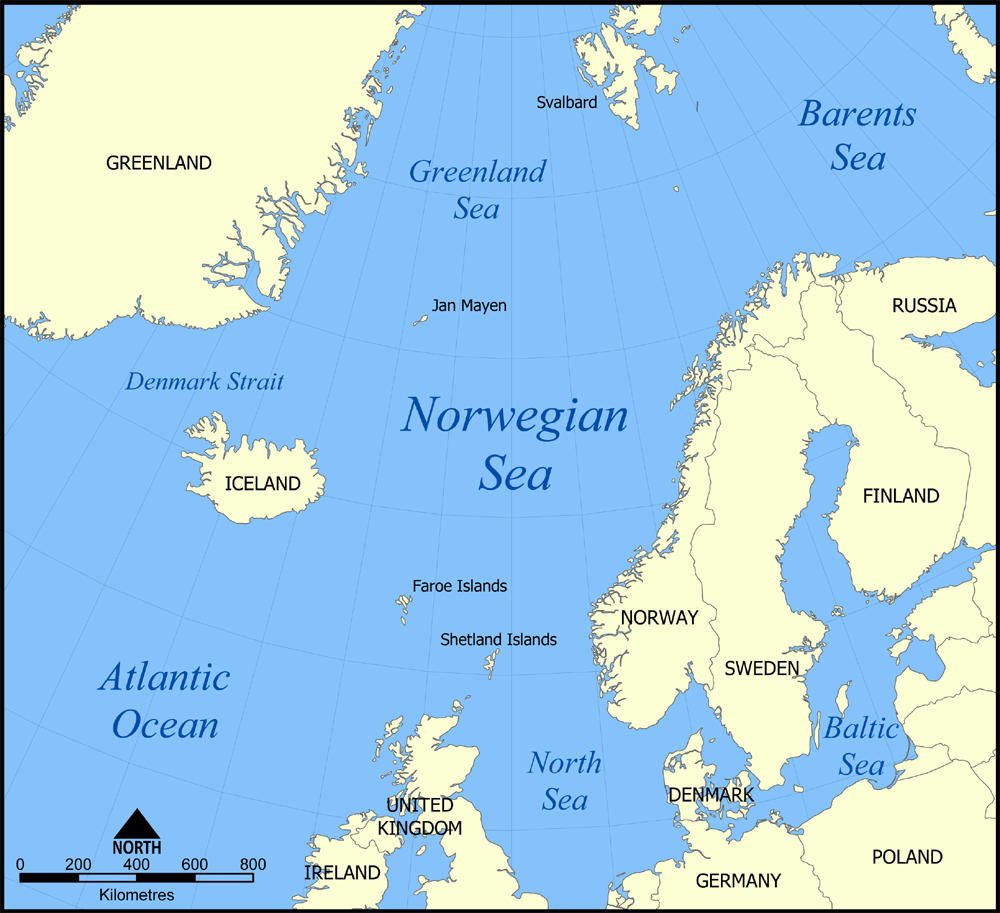
Map of the Norwegian Sea, showing the north of Scotland, the Shetland Islands and southern Norway

In March 1916, Admiral John Jellicoe, the commander-in-chief of the Grand Fleet, reinforced the Northern Patrol (10th Cruiser Squadron) with cruisers from three of the cruiser squadrons of the Grand Fleet, to keep one cruiser on watch between the latitudes of 62° and 65° on the meridian of the Shetland Isles, through which he predicted that German commerce raiders would pass. The patrol supplemented the ships of the 10th Cruiser Squadron further to the west. At first, the ships were taken from the 2nd Cruiser Squadron, 3rd Cruiser Squadron and the 7th Cruiser Squadron but eventually devolved to the 2nd Cruiser Squadron. The intention was to keep a permanent watch by a cruiser and an armed boarding steamer but by early 1917, three of each were kept at sea.

After a false alarm caused by decoded German wireless messages by the code breakers of Room 40 at the Admiralty, another warning in March led the Admiralty to order the commander in chief of the Grand Fleet, Admiral David Beatty, to reinforce the Northern Patrol and to watch the Norwegian coast. Two cruisers were ordered to patrol north of the Shetland Isles along the meridian of 1° West and sent the 4th Cruiser Squadron and four destroyers to guard the Norwegian coast between Nordfjorden and Sognefjorden. The ships returned on 14 March having seen nothing and were not sent back. On 11 March 1917, Rear-Admiral Sir Sydney Fremantle, the commander of the 2nd Cruiser Squadron, ordered that the patrol line north of the Shetlands was to be taken up indefinitely by ships of the 2nd Cruiser Squadron, sailing from Swarbacks Minn on the west coast of Shetland.

HMS Achilles (Captain Francis Martin-Leake) sailed with the armed boarding steamer (ABS) SS Dundee (Captain Selwyn Day). Dundee was a 2,187 GRT ship, armed with two 4 in (102 mm) guns and two 3-pounder guns. Minotaur and ABS Royal Scot and Duke of Edinburgh with the ABS Fiona were also on patrol. Ship sightings were common and from 12 to 15 March the British ships had conducted routine examinations of vessels every day. The patrols were uneventful until 16 March, the day appointed for their relief. Achilles and Dundee were at the north end of the patrol line due to turn south, in wintry weather, the difficulty of which had led to Achilles having 19 men on sick. The sky was covered by dull grey clouds, being pushed northwards by a south-easterly wind, with occasional darker patches bringing snow or freezing rain; the temperature was 3.3 °C (37.9 °F). Near noon, a ship was sighted to the east of Achilles.

== Prelude ==
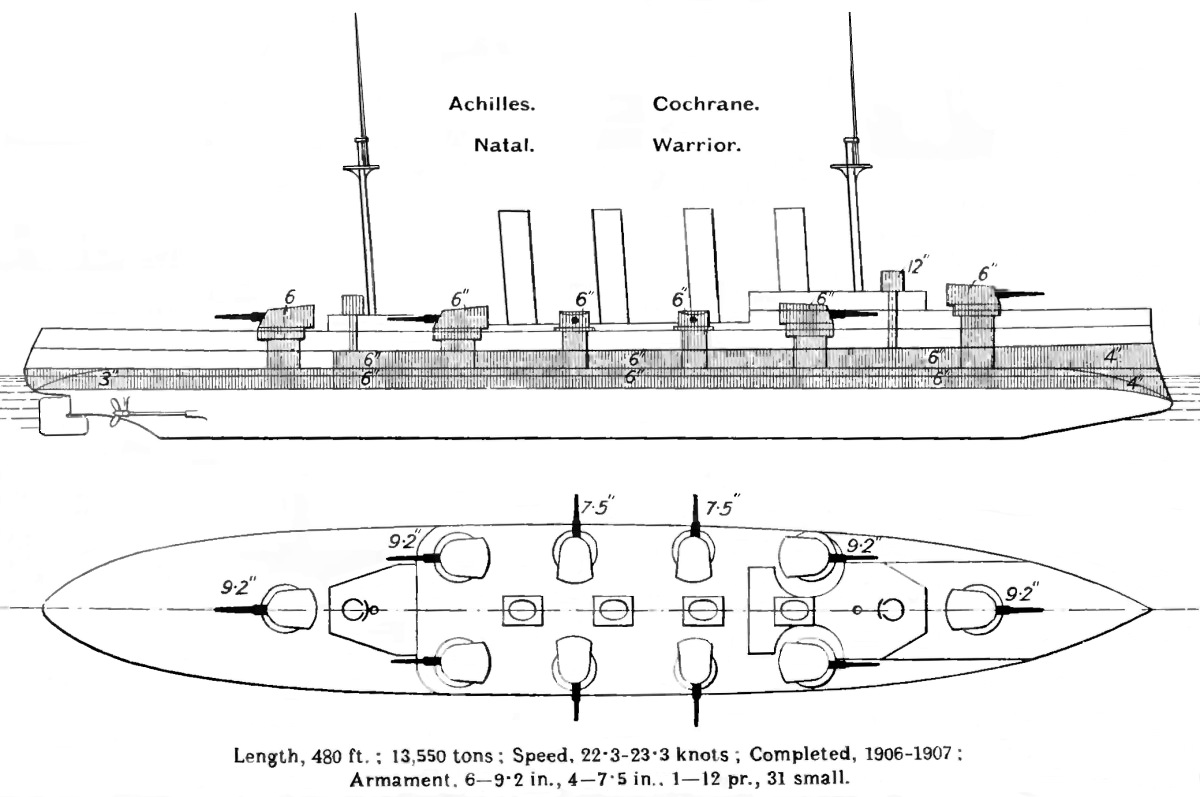
Right elevation and plan view from Brassey's Naval Annual of the Warrior class; the shaded areas show armour.

Leake signalled Dundee to follow and turned east but it took until 2:00 p.m. for Achilles, eventually steaming at 18 kn (21 mph; 33 km/h), to overhaul the ship and signal it to stop, then turn towards Dundee, which had fallen behind. Day was ordered to send an examination party to inspect the ship, which aroused his suspicion because it flew a Norwegian flag and had the name Rena but had a large "N" painted on the hull upside-down. The vessel also looked much bigger than the 3,000-gross register ton (GRT)-ship listed in Lloyd's Register of Shipping. Day could see that woodwork had been removed, no wireless equipment was visible and the ship had managed to steam at 13 kn (15 mph; 24 km/h) for some hours, unusual for a merchant ship.

The second in command of Dundee would normally lead a boarding party but was off the ship, along with another officer and eleven ratings. Day voiced his suspicions to Lieutenant Frederick Lawson, Royal Naval Reserve (RNR), an Australian, who volunteered to lead a boarding party because of the inexperience of the officer who would normally deputise for the second in command. (Note: The boarding party comprised Lawson, four Shetland Islanders, favoured for their skill in the handling of small boats, Henry Anderson, his brother Robert, and their distant cousins, Henry James and Magnus John Anderson; the fifth member was a Liverpudlian, Alfred Burchall Royal Naval Volunteer Reserve (RNVR).) At 2:45 p.m. the boarding party rowed over to the ship and went out of sight as it rounded the ship to the starboard (lee [downwind] side). As Day waited for Larson to signal, he moved Dundee, to keep on the weather (upwind) quarter, at right angles to the unknown ship, ready to fire broadside. The position was dangerous because a broadside from the ship would sink Dundee at once and Day could only prevent the other ship from getting broadside on. After a few minutes Day realised that the merchant ship moving in a continuous turn. Day kept the gun-crews ready and at 3:40 p.m. the Norwegian flag painted on the side of the ship fell off into the water.

== Action ==
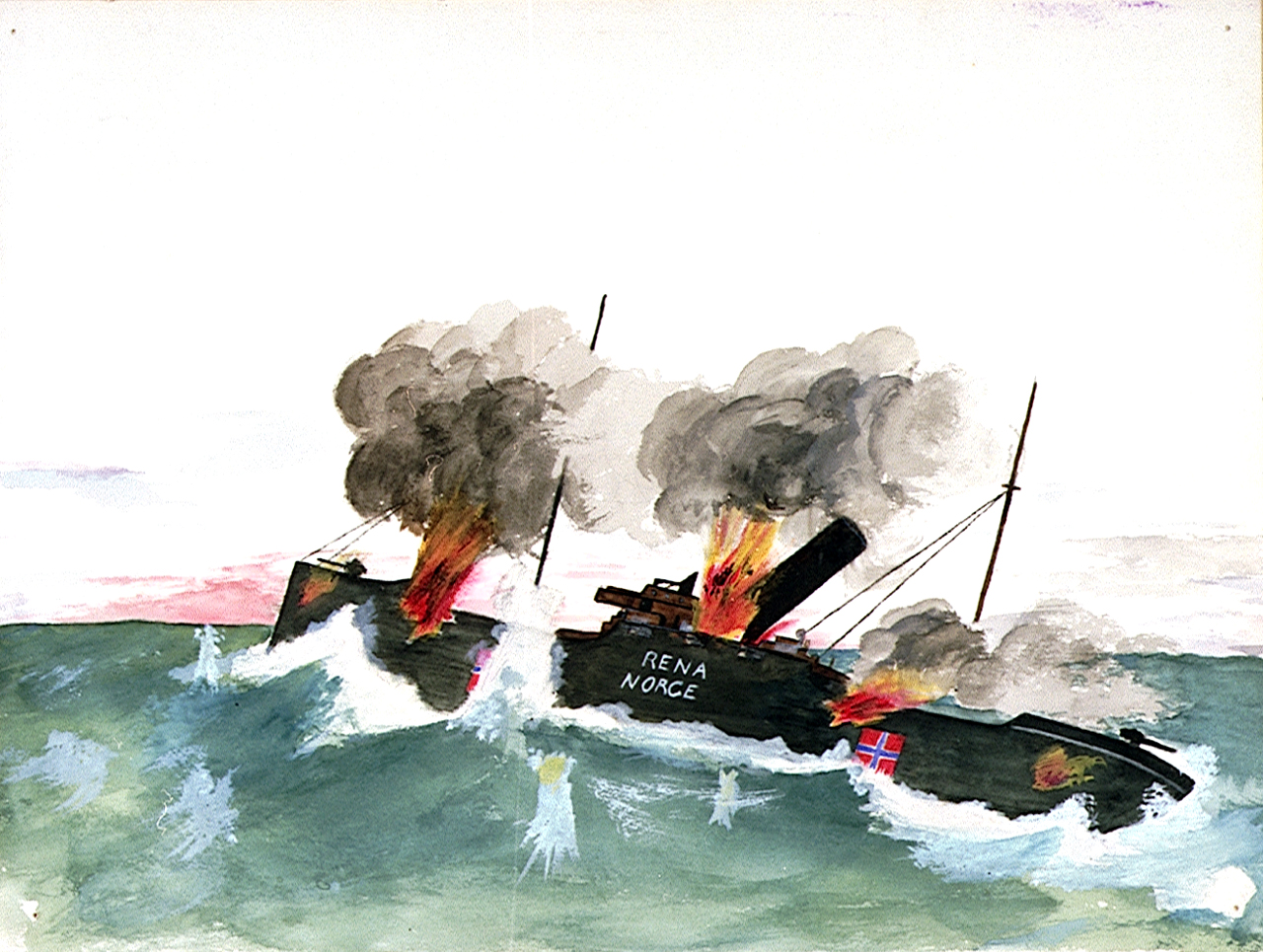
Destruction of the German raider Leopard, disguised as the Norwegian ship Rena, 1917 (RMG PU6814)

Day ordered his gun crews to open fire and shells hit Leopard from the stern at such close range that every shot hit, smoke and steam rising from the deck. Two torpedoes passed barely 20 yd (18 m) from the stern of Dundee almost immediately. Achilles was 4 nmi (4.6 mi; 7.4 km) distant to the east-north-east with Dundee in grave danger if it opened fire on the strange ship. Leopard began to move and Day manoeuvred past its stern and raked it with Dundee's 4-inch guns and its 3-pounder, which was trained on the bridge of the raider, its twenty hits may have killed the bridge crew early on. At such close range the gunners on Dundee could not miss and smoke and steam soon began to rise from Leopard. Laffert ordered a turn to starboard but Day anticipated this and Dundee turned to port to avoid a broadside. By this time Leopard had been hit forty times and clouds of smoke billowed from Leopard, blown north-west by the wind.

Achilles opened fire on the raider about five minutes after Dundee which then sailed towards Achilles down the smoke from Leopard under the fall of shot. The German ship fired a broadside but the aim was poor and after a few minutes Dundee was safely behind Achilles. About five minutes after Dundee had opened fire on Leopard, Achilles began to register hits on Leopard, which kept disappearing in black smoke, forcing Achilles to pause its firing. The exchange continued for an hour but the heavy shells from Achilles and internal fires started explosions that sent bursts of flame through the smoke; Dundee ceased fire, having run out of ammunition. When Leopard began to sink, some observers thought that the fore-end of the ship was red-hot, others that it was melting but the crew continued to return fire. A little after 4:30 p.m. Leopard sank with all hands along with the boarding party. A search for survivors was not conducted for fear of submarine attack; the boat that had carried the boarding party was recovered by a merchant ship several months later.

== Aftermath ==
=== Casualties ===
All 319 hands on Leopard plus the six men of the British boarding party were killed; the British vessels suffered slight damage.

=== Subsequent operations ===
No ships were reported missing for six days after the destruction of Leopard then on 22 March a neutral ship reported that it had been stopped on the South American trade route by a sailing ship (SMS Seeadler) on 25 February.
