= HMS Perth =

British coastal liner, armed boarding steamer and convoy rescue ship

History
- Name: 1915: Perth; 1946: Lafonia; 1950: Valfiorita
- Namesake: 1915: Perth
- Owner: 1915: Dundee, Perth & London Shipping Co Ltd; 1946: Falkland Islands Company; 1950: Lloyd Mediterraneo SpA; 1960: Carlo Lolli-Ghetti & C, SpA
- Operator: 1915: (United Kingdom) Royal Navy
- Port of registry: 1915: (United Kingdom) Dundee; 1950: (Italy) Rome; 1960: (Italy) Venice / Ancona
- Route: 1919: Dundee – Tilbury
- Builder: Caledon, Dundee
- Yard number: 240
- Launched: 15 April 1915
- Completed: July 1915
- Identification: UK official number 123346; code letters JLNW; 1915: pennant number MI 23; 1918: pennant number MI 17; 1930: call sign GQXB; 1950: call sign ICIU
- Fate: scrapped in 1962

General characteristics
- Type: coastal liner
- Tonnage: 2,502 GRT, 1,418 NRT
- Length: 280.2 ft (85.4 m)
- Beam: 40.2 ft (12.3 m)
- Draught: 17 ft 8 in (5.38 m)
- Depth: 17.7 ft (5.4 m)
- Installed power: 345 NHP
- Propulsion: triple-expansion engine
- Speed: 14 knots (26 km/h)
- Sensors & processing systems: echo sounding device (by 1934); high-frequency direction finding (during WW2)
- Armament: in WW1: 3 × 4.7 inch guns

HMS Perth was a steamship that was built in Scotland in 1915, renamed Lafonia in 1946 and Valfiorita in 1950, and scrapped in Italy in 1962. She was designed as a coastal passenger and cargo liner, but was completed in the First World War as an armed boarding steamer for the Royal Navy. In the Second World War she was converted into an ocean boarding vessel, and served also as a convoy rescue ship.

The ship did see merchant service: with the Dundee, Perth & London Shipping Company Ltd in the 1920s and 1930s, the Falkland Islands Company in the late 1950s, and with successive Italian from 1950 until she was scrapped in Italy in 1962.

The Dundee, Perth & London Shipping Co Ltd was founded in 1826. In its long history it had six ships called Perth, named after the city of Perth in Perthshire. The ship built in 1915 was the fifth of these. She is the only Royal Navy ship ever to have been called Perth.

== Building ==
The Caledon Shipbuilding & Engineering Company built Perth as yard number 240. She was launched on 15 February 1915 and completed that July.

Her dimensions were similar to those of Dundee, which Caledon had built for the Dundee, Perth & London Shipping Co in 1911. Perth's registered length was 280.2 ft (85.4 m), her beam was 40.2 ft (12.3 m) and her depth was 17.7 ft (5.4 m). Her tonnages were 2,502 GRT and 1,418 NRT. She had a three-cylinder triple-expansion steam engine that was rated at 345 NHP, which gave her a speed of 14 knots (26 km/h).

The Dundee, Perth & London Shipping Co Ltd registered Perth in Dundee. Her UK official number was 123346 and her code letters were JLNW.

== Perth ==
The Admiralty requisitioned the ship from new and had her completed as an armed boarding steamer. She was armed with three 4.7 inch guns and commissioned into the Royal Navy as HMS Perth.

Perth was in Royal Navy service by 25 October 1915. She was assigned to the East Indies Station. She left Dundee on 17 November, and sailed via Devonport, Gibraltar, Malta, Port Said, the Suez Canal and Aden to the island of Perim, where she arrived on 20 December. Perim is in the Bab-el-Mandeb, the strait between the Red Sea and Indian Ocean. Britain then used Perim as a coaling station and naval base. The Royal Navy assigned Perth to patrol in and around the Red Sea. She visited ports including Suez, Port Sudan, Kamaran, Jeddah, Aden, Berbera, Elaiya, Gizan, Mokha, Hodeida, Damo and Loheiya.

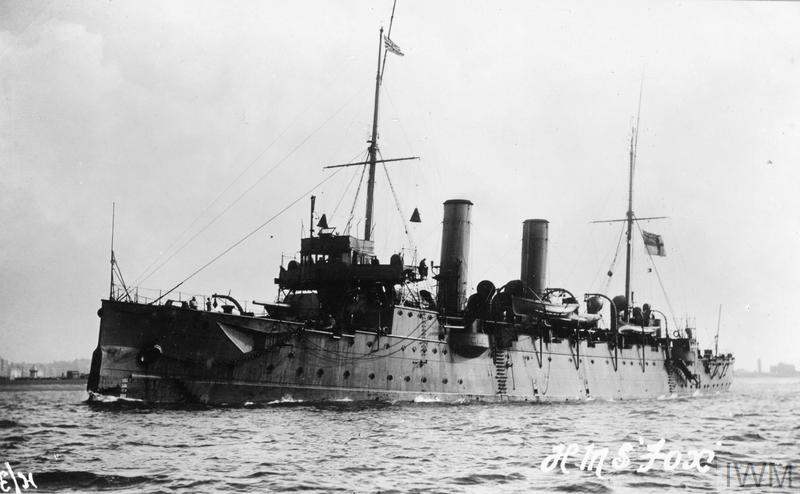
The cruiser HMS Fox, which led the bombardment of Jeddah.

On 15 June 1916, Perth took part in a joint sea, air and land attack on the Ottoman Army garrison at Jeddah. Perth and the cruiser HMS Fox entered the inner harbour and bombarded the town walls. A seaplane from HMS Engadine bombed Ottoman positions. The British bombardment supported Hejaz irregular forces, who had been attacking Jeddah since 10 June. The Ottoman garrison surrendered the next day. This cut off a supply route to the Ottoman garrison defending Mecca, which then fell to Hejaz irregulars on 4 July.

For repairs and refitting, Perth paid two visits to the Royal Indian Navy dockyard in Bombay in British India. The first was in October and early November 1916, and the second was in November and December 1917.

On 22 August 1918 Perth left Perim for the last time. She sailed via the Suez Canal, and Port Said to Alexandria, where she joined a convoy that went via Bizerta and Gibraltar to home waters. On 1 October the convoy was crossing the Bay of Biscay, on a zig-zag course to reduce the risk of attack. Perth was zig-zgging ahead of the convoy when she sighted the SM U-139. Perth's guns engaged the submarine at a range of 8,800–4,800 yards (8,000–4,400 m). U-139 returned fire, damaging Perth and killing her paymaster and a sub-lieutenant. The U-boat dived and torpedoed two cargo ships in the convoy: the British Bylands and Italian Manin. Perth rescued Bylands' crew, and inspected the abandoned Manin, and then buried her dead at sea.

On 3 October Perth left the convoy for Milford Haven and then Pembroke Dock, where she arrived on 5 October to discharge cargo and be repaired. On 10 October she reached Avonmouth in England, where she exchanged her ammunition and bunkered. She returned to Milford Haven, where she left on 1 November escorting a convoy to Gibraltar, arriving on 7 November.

Perth was still in Gibraltar when the Armistice of 11 November 1918 was signed. She left on 14 November, reached Plymouth in England on 17 November, and entered Devonport on 20 November. In December 1918 she was returned to her owners.

In the interwar period Perth fulfilled the rôle for which she had been designed: running a coastal cargo and passenger service between Dundee and ports on the east coast of England, usually Tilbury. She also made occasional voyages to Southend-on-Sea, Brighton, or the Netherlands. But passenger numbers declined, and by the late 1930s she was sailing only in the summer.

By 1920 Perth was equipped for wireless telegraphy, and by 1930 her call sign was GQXB. She had an echo sounding device by 1934.

In 1940 the Admiralty requisitioned her again, and she was converted into an ocean boarding vessel. During the war she served also as a convoy rescue ship, for which her equipment included high-frequency direction finding. In the Battle of the Atlantic she sailed in more than 60 convoys and rescued 455 seafarers, making her one of the most successful convoy rescue ships of the war.

== Lafonia and Valfiorita ==
In 1946 the Falkland Islands Company bought the ship and renamed her Lafonia. In 1950 Lloyd Mediterraneo SpA bought her, renamed her Valfiorita and registered her in Rome. By 1959 she was equipped with wireless direction finding.

In 1960 Carlo Lolli-Ghetti & C, SpA bought her and registered her in Venice or Ancona. She was scrapped in San Giorgio di Nogaro, with work starting on 5 November 1962.

== See also ==
- SS Dundee, a similar Dundee, Perth & London Shipping Company coastal liner, which also served as an armed boarding steamer.
