= Armed boarding steamer =

British Royal Navy vessel in the First World War

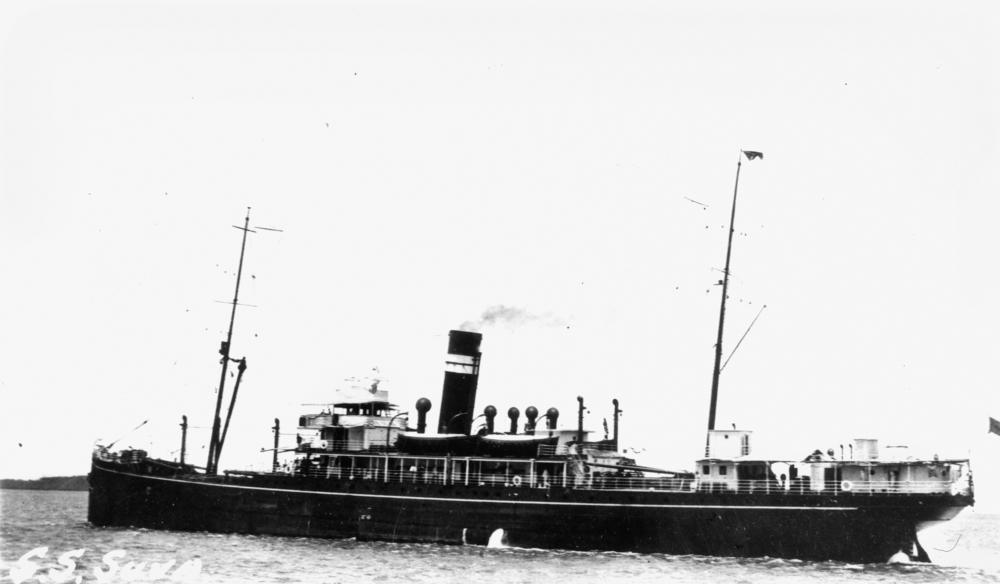
HMS Suva in 1919

An armed boarding steamer (or "armed boarding ship", or "armed boarding vessel") was a merchantman that the British Royal Navy converted to a warship during the First World War. AB steamers or vessels had the role of enforcing wartime blockades by intercepting and boarding foreign vessels. The boarding party would inspect the foreign ship to determine whether to detain the ship and send it into port or permit it to go on its way.

== Origins ==
On 28 September 1914 Admiral John Jellicoe, commander-in-chief of the Grand Fleet, sent a telegram in which he pointed out that he did not have enough destroyers available to enforce the blockade. Furthermore, the weather was often too severe for the destroyers. Although Jellicoe did not mention it, after the loss on 22 September of the cruisers HMS Cressy, Aboukir and Hogue, he also did not want large warships making themselves sitting targets for submarines by stopping to examine merchant vessels.

The first request was for 12 vessels, all to be capable of 12–14 knots (22–26 km/h; 14–16 mph), be able to carry enough coal for five days at sea, have wireless, and have boats suitable for boarding parties to use. Each armed boarding steamer was to carry two 3-pounder guns (47 mm/L50) and be under the command of an officer from the Royal Navy. These 12 vessels were requisitioned in October and completed by mid to late-November. Other vessels followed.

The Navy found that cross-Channel passenger vessels were particularly suitable because of their large cargo capacity. As experience with the programme increased, the armed boarding vessels received heavier armament. The Royal Navy realized the need for heavier armament after the German auxiliary cruiser SMS Meteor attacked and sank the armed boarding ship HMS Ramsey on 8 August 1915. The navy wanted to arm the boarding ships with some obsolete 14-inch torpedo tubes, and modern 4-inch (100 mm) guns (possibly the BL 4-inch Mk VII naval gun); Meteor had sunk Ramsey using both a torpedo, and gunfire from two 88 mm (3.5-inch) guns. (Note: Friedman states that Meteor sank the armed boarding vessel King Orry.)

The Navy pressed the vessels into other roles. Some carried depth charges for anti-submarine duty while escorting convoys. Still others, particularly in the Mediterranean, served as transports. A quarter were lost during active duty in the war; eight sunk by submarines, one by a German auxiliary cruiser, and one by mines. Two went on to serve again in WWII, with one then being lost to bombing.

== Vessels ==
- HMS Alouette – returned to owners 21 November 1919
- HMS Amsterdam – ABS from October 1914 until returned to owners 29 September 1919
- HMS Anglia – 1913 yacht purchased September 1939 and sold 1946
- HMS Caesarea – Launched in 1910 and served as ABS 31 October 1914 to December 1915. Became Manxmaid and served as Brucce in WWII.
- HMS Cambria – Launched in 1897 and hired as ABS on 8 August 1914; hospital ship 7 August 1915
- HMS Carron – Launched in 1906; ABS from 22 November 1914 to 9 October 1919.
- HMS City of Belfast – launched 1893; ABS from 30 October 1914 to 3 October 1919
- HMS Duchess of Devonshire – Launched 1891; ABS from 30 October 1814 to 6 November 1919
- HMS Duke of Albany – sunk by SM UB-27 on 26 August 1916 20 miles east of the Pentland Skerries.
- HMS Duke of Clarence
- HMS Duke of Cornwall
- HMS Dundee – took part in the action of 16 March 1917, the destruction of the German auxiliary cruiser SMS Leopard. UC-49 torpedoed Dundee on 2 September 1917 off the Isles of Scilly, causing her to sink the next day.
- HMS Fauvette – Launched 1912; hired February 1915 as a store carrier, and ABS from 19 March 1915. Sunk by a mine in the Downs off the North Foreland (51°27′N 01°29′E) on 9 March 1916.
- HMS Fiona – Wrecked 6 September 1917 on the Pentland Skerries
- HMS Grangemouth – Launched 1898; ABS from 5 January 1915 to 1 April 1919
- HMS Grive – Launched 1905; hired as a store carrier 5 August 1914 and ABS from 14 February 1916. Torpedoed by UC-40 on 8 December 1917 in the North Sea off Lerwick; foundered 24 December.
- HMS Hazel – Launched 1907; ABS from 14 November 1914 to 17 February 1919
- HMS Heroic – Launched 1906; ABS from 18 November 1914 to 6 July 1920; troop transport July 1917 to January 1918.
- HMS King Orry – also served during World War II as an ocean boarding vessel; sunk during the Dunkirk evacuation.
- HMS Lama – Launched 1905; ABS from 12 July 1915 to 17 January 1918
- HMS Louvain – sunk by torpedo by SM UC-22 on 20 January 1918 while in the Kelos strait in the Aegean Sea; seven officers and 217 men killed; 17 survivors.
- HMS Lunka – Launched 1905; ABS from 20 July 1915 to 22 January 1919
- HMS Partridge – Launched 1906. ABS from 15 November 1914. Action with a U-boat on 15 March 1915. HMS Partridge (II) from 1916 to 12 July 1920.
- HMS Peel Castle
- HMS Perth – on 1 October 1918 beat off two attacks by a U-boat in the Bay of Biscay
- HMS Prince Abbas – Launched 1892. ABS from 5 June 1915 to November 1916.
- HMS Richard Welford – Launched 1908; ABS from 15 January 1915 to 26 February 1919
- HMS Rowan – Launched 1909. ABS from 14 November 1914 to 7 July 1917 and again from 11 July 1918 to 15 June 1920.
- HMS Royal Scot – Launched 910. ABS from 28 October 1914 to 12 January 1919.
- HMS SS Sarnia (1910) – SM U-65 sank her in the Mediterranean Sea off Alexandria, Egypt, (31°58′N 30°55′E), with the loss of 55 crew.
- HMS Scotia
- HMS Snaefell – sunk by torpedo by SM UB-105 on 5 June 1918 between Malta and Crete.
- HMS Stephen Furness – sunk by torpedo on 13 December 1917 by SM UB-65 off the Isle of Man, with the loss of 101 officers and men.
- HMS Suva
- HMS Tara – sunk by torpedo U-35 in Sollum Bay on the Egyptian coast on 5 November 1915
- HMS Ramsey – sunk by SMS Meteor in August 1915
- HMS Tihonus (or Thinonus) – sunk in the North Sea 50 nautical miles (93 km) east of Aberdeen (57°04′N 0°33′W) by SM UB-72.
- HMS Vienna – Launched 1894; Accommodation ship from 21 August 1914 to December, then decoy ship Antwerp from 1 January 1915 to 28 April 1915, and lastly ABS from 29 March 1915 to 25 August 1919.
- HMS Woodnut – Launched 1906 as Woodcock; ABS from 15 November 1914 to 31 March 1920
- HMS York – Launched 1907; ABS 3 January 1915 to 4 April 1919.

== See also ==
- Action of 16 March 1917 SS Dundee
- Ocean boarding vessel British vessels of similar purpose in the Second World War
- Hired armed vessels British vessels that performed convoy escort duties, anti-privateer patrols and ran errands during the French Revolutionary Wars and the Napoleonic Wars and earlier.
- Armed merchantman
