= Wyvern College =

Wyvern College may refer to:

- Wyvern College, Hampshire, a secondary school in Eastleigh, Hampshire, England
- Wyvern College, the former name of Wyvern St Edmund's, a secondary school near Salisbury, Wiltshire, England

== See also ==
- Wyvern (disambiguation)
