= SS Dundee =

Royal Navy armed boarding steamer

History

United Kingdom
- Name: Dundee
- Namesake: Dundee
- Owner: Dundee, Perth & London Shipping Co Ltd
- Operator: 1915: (United Kingdom) Royal Navy
- Port of registry: 1911: (United Kingdom) Dundee
- Builder: Caledon, Dundee
- Yard number: 221
- Launched: 24 August 1911
- Completed: November 1911
- Identification: UK official number 123338; code letters HTRJ; pennant number: MI 12
- Fate: Sunk by torpedo, 3 September 1917

General characteristics
- Type: coastal liner
- Tonnage: 2,187 GRT, 987 NRT
- Length: 290.1 ft (88.4 m)
- Beam: 41.2 ft (12.6 m)
- Depth: 18.6 ft (5.7 m)
- Decks: 2
- Installed power: 452 NHP
- Propulsion: single screw; triple-expansion engine
- Speed: 15 knots (28 km/h)
- Armament: by 1917: 2 × 4-inch guns; 1 × 3-pounder gun

SS Dundee was a British steamship that was built in Scotland in 1911 and sunk by enemy action in the Celtic Sea in 1917. She was designed as a coastal passenger and cargo liner for the Dundee, Perth & London Shipping Company Ltd, but in 1915 she was converted into an armed boarding steamer for the Royal Navy. She took part in the Action of 16 March 1917, was sunk by a U-boat six months later, and lost members of her crew in both actions.

The Dundee, Perth & London Shipping Co Ltd was founded in 1826. In its long history it had eight ships called Dundee, named after the city of Dundee on the east coast of Scotland. The ship built in 1911 was the fifth of these.

== Building ==
The Caledon Shipbuilding & Engineering Company built Dundee as yard number 221. She was launched on 24 August 1911 and completed that November. Her registered length was 290.1 ft (88.4 m), her beam was 41.2 ft (12.6 m) and her depth was 18.6 ft (5.7 m). Her tonnages were 2,187 GRT and 987 NRT. She had a three-cylinder triple-expansion steam engine that was rated at 452 NHP, which gave her a speed of 15 knots (28 km/h).

== Merchant service ==
The Dundee, Perth & London Shipping Co registered Dundee at Dundee. Her UK official number was 123338 and her code letters were HTRJ. She ran coastal cargo and passenger service between Dundee and ports on the east coast of England.

== Naval service ==
In 1915 the Admiralty requisitioned Dundee and had her converted into an armed boarding steamer. She was armed with at least two 4-inch guns and one 47 mm (1.9 in) 3-pounder gun. She was assigned to the 10th Cruiser Squadron.

=== SMS Leopard ===
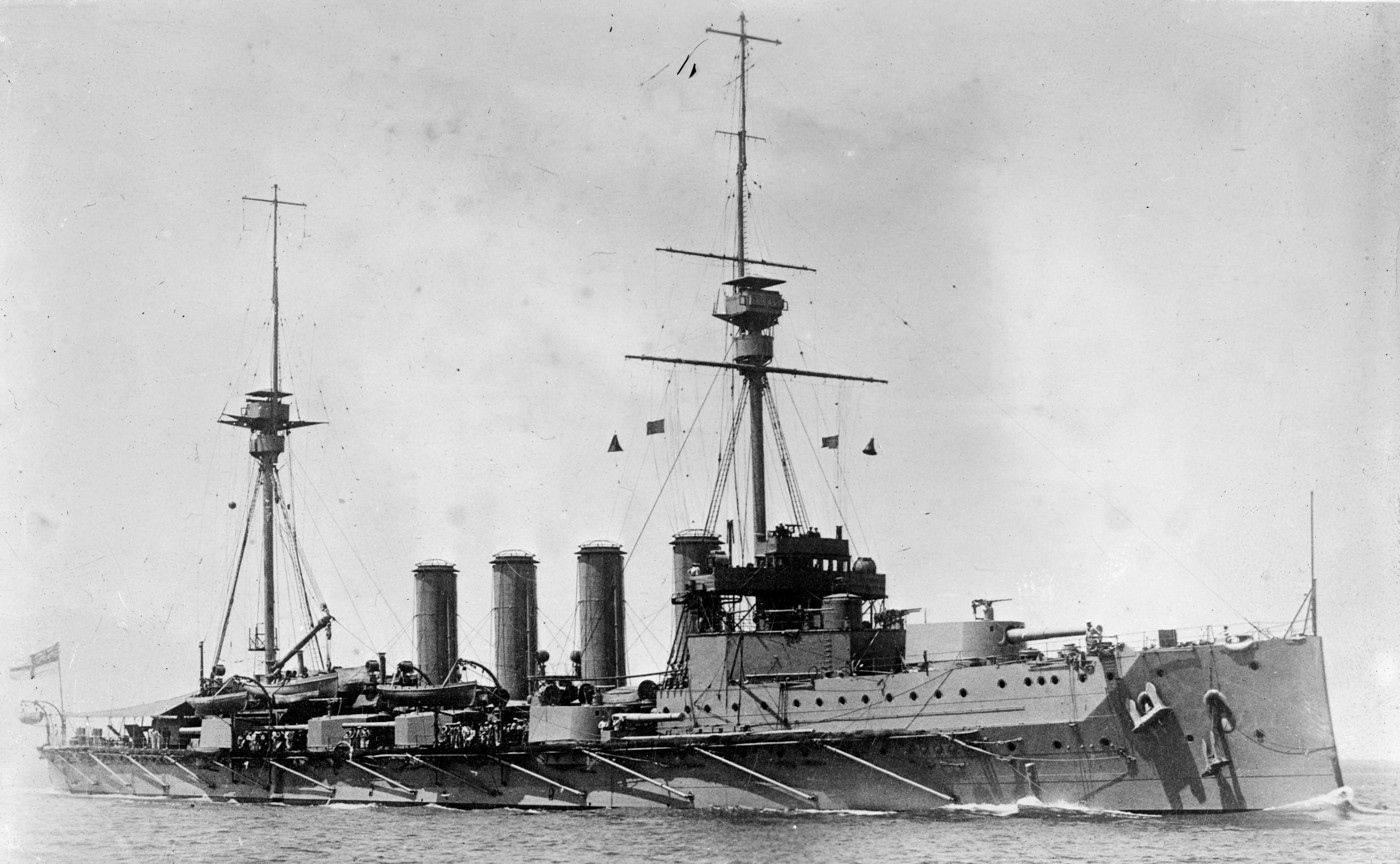
The cruiser HMS Achilles

By March 1917 Dundee was commanded by a Commander Selwyn Day, RNR, and was serving in the 2nd Cruiser Squadron. On 16 March she was patrolling the Norwegian Sea with the armoured cruiser HMS Achilles when they sighted a cargo ship that had Norwegian flags and "NORGE" (Norwegian for "Norway") painted on both sides, was flying the Norwegian ensign, and carrying the name Rena. Achilles overtook the merchant ship and ordered her to stop for Dundee to inspect her. Dundee lowered one of her boats, in which she sent a boarding party of five ratings led by a lieutenant to inspect the ship.

The merchant ship, still flying the Norwegian flag, opened the gun ports on her port side, revealing her 15 cm SK L/40 naval guns and 8.8 cm SK L/45 naval guns. The ship was the German commerce raider SMS Leopard. Dundee immediately opened fire at a range of about 1,000 yd (910 m). Dundee's 4-inch guns immediately hit the raider's gun deck and engine room, and Dundee's 3-pounder gun aimed at her bridge. Achilles, which was farther away, also opened fire on Leopard. Dundee fired 44 4-inch shells and 25 3-pounder shells before Leopard fired her first shot.

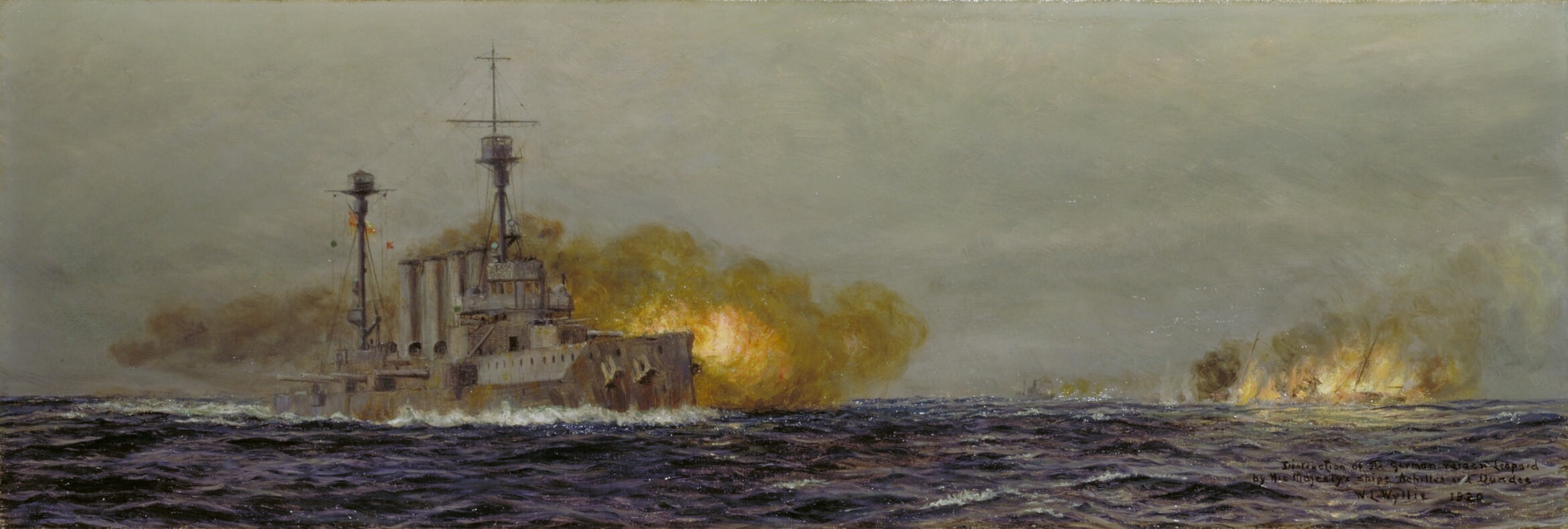
Painting by WL Wyllie, RA, of HMS Achilles (left) firing at SMS Leopard (right). Dundee is the small grey shape just to the left of Leopard.

Leopard fired three salvoes at Dundee, but all either fell short or overshot. Thereafter, the raider's guns continued the fight with single shots. The raider also fired three torpedoes, but evasive action by Cdr Day and his helmsman ensured that they all missed Dundee. After 35 minutes' combat, Dundee ran out of ammunition. Achilles continued to fire on Leopard, which by then was on fire and had only one gun left in action. Leopard sank with all hands, 55 minutes after opening fire on Dundee.

The lieutenant and five ratings that Dundee sent to board Leopard were never found. Early on in the engagement, Dundee sighted an empty boat in Leopard's vicinity. Cdr Day concluded that Leopard had captured the boarding party, and all six men had then died when the raider sank.

At the time of the engagement, Dundee was short of officers. Her gunlayers had to do their own spotting and select targets on Leopard on their own initiative. Cdr Day credited his gunlayers' "skill" and "marksmanship" for crippling Leopard and preventing the raider from hitting Dundee.

On Day's recommendation, in June 1917 two of Dundee's gunlayers were awarded the Distinguished Service Medal and two were mentioned in dispatches. The lieutenant who commanded the boarding party was also mentioned in dispatches. Day was promoted to captain and made a Companion of the Distinguished Service Order.

=== UC-49 ===
On 2 September 1917 Dundee was patrolling southwest of the Isles of Scilly when UC-49 hit her with one torpedo, killing nine of Dundee's crew. Dundee sank the next day at position 48°50′N 9°20′W.

== See also ==
- HMS Perth, a similar Dundee, Perth & London Shipping Company coastal liner, which also served as an armed boarding steamer.
