= List of shipwrecks in December 1918 =

The list of shipwrecks in December 1918 includes ships sunk, foundered, grounded, or otherwise lost during December 1918.

== 1 December ==
List of shipwrecks: 1 December 1918
| Ship | State | Description |
|---|---|---|
| Einswarden | Imperial German Navy | The Einswarden-class Vorpostenboot was sunk by mines in the German Bight. |
| Sea Gull | United Kingdom | The tug, towing coal barge Margarida (United Kingdom) from the Tyne for Boulogne, France, was stranded on the Goodwin Sands, off Kent, England, rolling over and becoming a wreck. The crew were rescued by the boat of Margarida, which had been kept from stranding. |
| Tours | France | The steamer was beached/wrecked on Gower Rocks in bad weather at the foot of the Pwlldu Head cliff, located near Swansea Wales, United Kingdom, and was abandoned. Refloated in July 1919 and towed to Swansea. |

== 2 December ==
List of shipwrecks: 2 December 1918
| Ship | State | Description |
|---|---|---|
| Tours | France | The ship ran aground in Deepslade Bay. She was on a voyage from Saint-Nazaire, Loire-Inférieure to Swansea, Glamorgan, United Kingdom. Tours was refloated on 29 June 1919. |

== 3 December ==
List of shipwrecks: 3 December 1918
| Ship | State | Description |
|---|---|---|
| George H. Van Vleck | United States | The steamer foundered in the Detroit River near Ecorse, Michigan, obstructing the channel. Wreck removal work finished 5 April 1919. |
| Mineola | United States | The forward half of the steamer (she had been cut in two to facilitate passage through the Welland Canal) foundered in a severe snowstorm in Lake Ontario five miles (8.0 km) south of Duck Island. Lost with all 11 hands. |

== 4 December ==
List of shipwrecks: 4 December 1918
| Ship | State | Description |
|---|---|---|
| Kum-Chow | Burma | The steamship departed from Rangoon for Colombo, Ceylon. No further trace, reported missing. |

== 5 December ==
List of shipwrecks: 5 December 1918
| Ship | State | Description |
|---|---|---|
| HMS Cassandra | Royal Navy | Russian Civil War: British campaign in the Baltic: The C-class cruiser struck a mine and sank in the Gulf of Finland with the loss of ten of her 400 crew. |

== 6 December ==
List of shipwrecks: 6 December 1918
| Ship | State | Description |
|---|---|---|
| Capt. Jack | United States | The lighter sank at New London Navy Yard, New London, Connecticut, when an extremely low tide caused her to settle on a pile which penetrated her bottom. |

== 7 December ==
List of shipwrecks: 7 December 1918
| Ship | State | Description |
|---|---|---|
| Gerisoles | United States | The cargo ship foundered in Lake Superior with the loss of all hands. |
| Inkerman | United States | The cargo ship foundered in Lake Superior with the loss of all hands. |

== 8 December ==
List of shipwrecks: 8 December 1918
| Ship | State | Description |
|---|---|---|
| Minola | United States | The cargo ship foundered in Lake Ontario. |
| North West | United States | The cargo ship foundered in Lake Ontario. |

== 9 December ==
List of shipwrecks: 9 December 1918
| Ship | State | Description |
|---|---|---|
| Eva C. | (Dominion of Newfoundland) Newfoundland | The schooner was abandoned in the Atlantic Ocean (42°00′N 86°00′W). Her crew were rescued. |

== 10 December ==
List of shipwrecks: 10 December 1918
| Ship | State | Description |
|---|---|---|
| Moto | United Kingdom | The cargo ship collided with a warship and sank in the North Sea 20 nautical miles (37 km) north of the mouth of the River Tyne. Her crew were rescued. |

== 11 December ==
List of shipwrecks: 11 December 1918
| Ship | State | Description |
|---|---|---|
| USS Lake Bloomington | United States Navy | The cargo ship grounded and sunk east of Point de la Combre, France, at the mouth of the Gironde River. |
| Richard | United States | The lighter was beached near the Central Vermont Dock, New London, Connecticut, to keep her from sinking. |

== 12 December ==
List of shipwrecks: 12 December 1918
| Ship | State | Description |
|---|---|---|
| Helen Stewart | United Kingdom | The schooner was abandoned in the Atlantic Ocean 12 nautical miles (22 km) north of Graciosa, Canary Islands, Spain. Her eight crew survived. |

== 13 December ==
List of shipwrecks: 13 December 1918
| Ship | State | Description |
|---|---|---|
| Rudmore | United Kingdom | The cargo ship collided with Crown of Galicia (United Kingdom) and sank in the River Thames at Purfleet, Essex. Her crew were rescued. |

== 15 December ==
List of shipwrecks: 15 December 1918
| Ship | State | Description |
|---|---|---|
| Grecian Prince | United Kingdom | The trawler struck a mine and sank in the North Sea with the loss of six of her eight crew. |
| Sehome | United States | The passenger ship collided with General Frisbie (United States) and sank in San Francisco Bay with the loss of two of her crew. |

== 16 December ==
List of shipwrecks: 16 December 1918
| Ship | State | Description |
|---|---|---|
| Nils | Norway | The cargo ship struck a submerged wreck at New York, United States and was beached. |
| Tacoma | United States | Out of service and anchored with no one on board in the harbor at Metlakatla in Southeast Alaska, the 11-ton, 35.7-foot (10.9 m) fishing vessel broke loose from her anchorage during a gale and drifted onto a reef in the harbor, where waves battered her to pieces. |

== 17 December ==
List of shipwrecks: 17 December 1918
| Ship | State | Description |
|---|---|---|
| Margaret Ann | United Kingdom | The schooner was abandoned in the Irish Sea off the Crow Rock. |
| Silex | United States | The steam-powered canal boat sank near Essex, Connecticut. |

== 19 December ==
List of shipwrecks: 21 December 1918
| Ship | State | Description |
|---|---|---|
| George Loomis | United States | The steamship departed from San Francisco, California for Marshfield, Oregon. No further trace, reported missing. |

== 20 December ==
List of shipwrecks: 20 December 1918
| Ship | State | Description |
|---|---|---|
| Gitano | United Kingdom | The steamship was sighted off Flamborough Head, Yorkshire whilst on a voyage from Hull, Yorkshire to Gothenburg, Sweden. No further trace, reported missing. |

== 21 December ==
List of shipwrecks: 21 December 1918
| Ship | State | Description |
|---|---|---|
| Killarney | United States | The 13-gross register ton motor vessel departed Petersburg, Territory of Alaska, bound for a cannery at Thomas Bay in Southeast Alaska with three people and a cargo of approximately five tons of salt, coal, cans, and groceries aboard and was never seen again. |

== 22 December ==
List of shipwrecks: 22 December 1918
| Ship | State | Description |
|---|---|---|
| Privateer | United Kingdom | The steam paddle tug, on a voyage from Le Tréport to the River Tyne, ran ashore at Équihen near Boulogne-sur-Mer, France and became a total loss. The crew were saved. |

== 24 December ==
List of shipwrecks: 24 December 1918
| Ship | State | Description |
|---|---|---|
| Aryan | United States | The barque burned in the Pacific Ocean 260 miles (420 km) east of the Chatham Islands. One lifeboat with her captain and 12 people reached Kaingaroa, Chatham Islands. The other lifeboat with nine crewmen never reached land. |

== 26 December ==
List of shipwrecks: 26 December 1918
| Ship | State | Description |
|---|---|---|
| Scow No. 12 | United States | The scow sank near the wharf of the Bay State Dredging Company, East Boston, Massachusetts. |
| Spartak | Soviet Navy | Russian Civil War: British campaign in the Baltic: Battle of Revel: The Kapitan Izylmetyev-class destroyer ran aground on the Develsej Bank on the approaches to Tallinn while under pursuit by HMS Calypso and HMS Caradoc (both Royal Navy) and was captured. Refloated and transferred to Estonia as Wambola (Estonian Navy). |

== 27 December ==
List of shipwrecks: 27 December 1918
| Ship | State | Description |
|---|---|---|
| USS Teaser | United States Navy | The patrol vessel was destroyed by fire in Hampton Roads, Virginia. |

== 28 December ==
List of shipwrecks: 28 December 1918
| Ship | State | Description |
|---|---|---|
| USS Tenadores | United States Navy | The cargo ship ran aground in dense fog on the Île d'Yeu, Vendée. Salvage efforts were abandoned on 2 January 1919 because she had rolled on her side and was breaking up. |
| USS Lake Weston | United States Navy | The Lake-class cargo ship stranded on the rocks about one mile (1.6 km) west of Nash Point in the Bristol Channel, Great Britain. Declared a total loss and stripped. The wreck was later sold, salvaged and returned to commercial service by new owners. |

== 29 December ==
List of shipwrecks: 29 December 1918
| Ship | State | Description |
|---|---|---|
| Merida | United Kingdom | The cargo ship was wrecked in the English Channel off Le Touquet, Pas-de-Calais, France. |

== 30 December ==
List of shipwrecks: 30 December 1918
| Ship | State | Description |
|---|---|---|
| USS Katherine W. Cullen | United States Navy | The barge sank while in tow of USS Heron (United States Navy), 15 miles (24 km) southeast from Boston Light, Massachusetts. |

== 31 December ==
List of shipwrecks: 31 December 1918
| Ship | State | Description |
|---|---|---|
| Arendal | United States | The 123.58-foot (37.67 m), 210-gross register ton three-masted schooner was abandoned along the coast of Wisconsin. She subsequently deteriorated into a wreck. |
| Manda | United Kingdom | The fishing vessel departed from Grimsby, Lincolnshire. No further trace, reported missing. |

== Unknown date ==
List of shipwrecks: Unknown date 1918
| Ship | State | Description |
|---|---|---|
| Benito Juarez | United States | The steamer foundered in a north east gale in Pacific Ocean off Molokai, Hawaii (21°36′00″N 156°11′00″W) on either 3, 10, or 12 December. Nine crewmen were killed. |
| Manda | United Kingdom | The 100.7-foot (30.7 m), 150-ton steam trawler departed Grimsby on 20 December and vanished. Lost with all ten crew. |
| N F Co. No. 1 | United States | The 30-ton scow was wrecked in Washington Bay (56°43′00″N 134°23′20″W) in Southeast Alaska. |
| Pioneer | United States | With no one on board, the 11-gross register ton, 33.5-foot (10.2 m) fishing vessel sank in the harbor at Metlakatla, Territory of Alaska. |
| SM U-3 | United Kingdom | The Type U-3 submarine foundered while under tow. |
| Undola | New South Wales | The steamship departed from Bellambi for Sydney. No further trace, reported missing. |
| Yâdigâr-ı-Millet (aka Jadhigar-i-Millet) | Ottoman Navy | The salvaged S165-class destroyer sank at her dock at Istanbul, Turkey. Raised in 1924 and scrapped. |
