= SM UC-49 =

German Type UC II minelaying U-boat

History

German Empire
- Name: UC-49
- Ordered: 12 January 1916
- Builder: Germaniawerft, Kiel
- Yard number: 265
- Launched: 7 November 1916
- Commissioned: 2 December 1916
- Fate: Mined on 14 August 1918

General characteristics
- Class & type: Type UC II submarine
- Displacement: 434 t (427 long tons), surfaced; 511 t (503 long tons), submerged
- Length: 52.69 m (172 ft 10 in) o/a; 40.96 m (134 ft 5 in) pressure hull
- Beam: 5.22 m (17 ft 2 in) o/a; 3.65 m (12 ft) pressure hull
- Draught: 3.64 m (11 ft 11 in)
- Propulsion: 2 × propeller shafts; 2 × 6-cylinder, 4-stroke diesel engines, 580–600 PS (430–440 kW; 570–590 shp); 2 × electric motors, 620 PS (460 kW; 610 shp)
- Speed: 11.8 knots (21.9 km/h; 13.6 mph), surfaced; 7.2 knots (13.3 km/h; 8.3 mph), submerged
- Range: 8,820–9,450 nmi (16,330–17,500 km; 10,150–10,870 mi) at 7 knots (13 km/h; 8.1 mph) surfaced; 56 nmi (104 km; 64 mi) at 4 knots (7.4 km/h; 4.6 mph) submerged
- Test depth: 50 m (160 ft)
- Complement: 26
- Armament: 6 × 100 cm (39.4 in) mine tubes; 18 × UC 200 mines; 3 × 50 cm (19.7 in) torpedo tubes (2 bow/external; one stern); 7 × torpedoes; 1 × 8.8 cm (3.5 in) Uk L/30 deck gun
- Notes: 30-second diving time

Service record
- Part of: I Flotilla; 1 March 1917 – 22 May 1918; Flandern II Flotilla; 22 May – 14 August 1918
- Commanders: Kptlt. Karl Petri; 2 December 1916 – 21 April 1917; Oblt.z.S. Alfred Arnold; 22 April – 17 May 1917; Kptlt. Karl Petri; 18 May – 2 November 1917; Oblt.z.S. Hans Kükenthal; 3 November 1917 – 14 August 1918
- Operations: 13 patrols
- Victories: 21 merchant ships sunk (37,728 GRT); 5 auxiliary warships sunk (28,317 GRT); 1 merchant ship damaged (2,241 GRT)

SM UC-49 was a German Type UC II minelaying submarine or U-boat in the German Imperial Navy (German: Kaiserliche Marine) during World War I. The U-boat was ordered on 20 November 1915 and was launched on 7 November 1916. She was commissioned into the German Imperial Navy on 2 December 1916 as SM UC-49. (Note: "SM" stands for "Seiner Majestät" (English: His Majesty's) and combined with the U for Unterseeboot would be translated as His Majesty's Submarine.) In 13 patrols UC-49 was credited with sinking 26 ships, either by torpedo or by mines laid. UC-49 was sunk by mine off coast of Flanders on 14 August 1918.

== Design ==
A Type UC II submarine, UC-49 had a displacement of 434 tonnes (427 long tons) when at the surface and 511 tonnes (503 long tons) while submerged. She had a length overall of 52.69 m (172 ft 10 in), a beam of 5.22 m (17 ft 2 in), and a draught of 3.64 m (11 ft 11 in). The submarine was powered by two six-cylinder four-stroke diesel engines each producing 290–300 metric horsepower (210–220 kW; 290–300 shp) (a total of 580–600 metric horsepower (430–440 kW; 570–590 shp)), two electric motors producing 620 metric horsepower (460 kW; 610 shp), and two propeller shafts. She had a dive time of 48 seconds and was capable of operating at a depth of 50 metres (160 ft).

The submarine had a maximum surface speed of 11.8 knots (21.9 km/h; 13.6 mph) and a submerged speed of 7.2 knots (13.3 km/h; 8.3 mph). When submerged, she could operate for 56 nautical miles (104 km; 64 mi) at 4 knots (7.4 km/h; 4.6 mph); when surfaced, she could travel 8,820 to 9,450 nautical miles (16,330 to 17,500 km; 10,150 to 10,870 mi) at 7 knots (13 km/h; 8.1 mph). UC-49 was fitted with six 100 centimetres (39 in) mine tubes, eighteen UC 200 mines, three 50 centimetres (20 in) torpedo tubes (one on the stern and two on the bow), seven torpedoes, and one 8.8 cm (3.5 in) Uk L/30 deck gun. Her complement was twenty-six crew members.

== Summary of raiding history ==
Date	Name	Nationality	Tonnage (Note: Merchant ship tonnages are in gross register tons. Military vessels are listed by tons displacement.)	Fate
3 May 1917	Helge	Denmark	162	Sunk
7 May 1917	Tore Jarl	Norway	1,256	Sunk
9 May 1917	Windward Ho	United Kingdom	226	Sunk
14 May 1917	Bel Lily	United Kingdom	168	Sunk
17 June 1917	Tosto	Norway	1,234	Sunk
22 July 1917	Cotovia	United Kingdom	4,020	Sunk
23 July 1917	HMS Otway	Royal Navy	12,077	Sunk
24 July 1917	Blake	United Kingdom	3,740	Sunk
25 July 1917	Dea	Norway	1,109	Sunk
25 August 1917	Nascent	United Kingdom	4,969	Sunk
2 September 1917	HMS Dundee	Royal Navy	2,187	Sunk
21 October 1917	Bunty	United Kingdom	73	Sunk
8 December 1917	Maindy Bridge	United Kingdom	3,653	Sunk
3 January 1918	HMW Blackwhale	Royal Navy	237	Sunk
24 January 1918	Fylgia	Sweden	1,741	Sunk
24 January 1918	Jönköping 2	Sweden	1,274	Sunk
9 February 1918	Maggie Smith	United Kingdom	24	Sunk
21 February 1918	Bør	Norway	1,149	Sunk
21 February 1918	Reaper	United Kingdom	91	Sunk
24 February 1918	Amsterdam	United Kingdom	806	Sunk
1 May 1918	Samsö	Denmark	324	Sunk
10 June 1918	Mountby	United Kingdom	3,263	Sunk
13 June 1918	HMS Patia	Royal Navy	6,103	Sunk
22 June 1918	Rhea	United Kingdom	1,308	Sunk
3 August 1918	HMAT Warilda	Royal Australian Navy	7,713	Sunk
8 August 1918	Portwood	United Kingdom	2,241	Damaged
13 August 1918	City of Brisbane	United Kingdom	7,138	Sunk
