= PS Rouen =

Passenger ferry

History

United Kingdom
- Name: 1888: Rouen; 1903: Duchess of Bucchleuch
- Owner: 1888: LB&SCR; 1903: JP & RP Little; 1907: Midland Railway
- Operator: 1903: Barrow SN Co
- Port of registry: 1888: Newhaven; 1903: Barrow
- Route: 1888: Newhaven – Dieppe; 1903: Barrow – Douglas
- Builder: Fairfield & Co, Govan
- Yard number: 330
- Launched: 12 April 1888
- Out of service: November 1909
- Identification: UK official number 95353; code letters LBHR
- Fate: Scrapped 1909

General characteristics
- Type: passenger ferry
- Tonnage: 838 GRT, 326 NRT
- Length: 250.6 ft (76.4 m)
- Beam: 29.1 ft (8.9 m)
- Depth: 14.0 ft (4.3 m)
- Decks: 1
- Installed power: 487 NHP
- Propulsion: 2-cylinder compound engine
- Speed: 19 1/4 knots (35.7 km/h)
- Capacity: passengers: 110 first class; 108 second class

PS Rouen was a passenger ferry that was built in Glasgow in 1888 for the London, Brighton and South Coast Railway (LB&SCR). In 1903 she was acquired by JP and RP Little for the Barrow Steam Navigation Company and renamed Duchess of Buccleuch. In 1907 she passed to the Midland Railway, and in 1909 she was scrapped.

== Building ==
The Fairfield Shipbuilding and Engineering Company built Rouen in Govan, Glasgow as yard number 330. She was launched on 12 April 1888 by Mrs Allen Sarle, the wife of the secretary and general manager of the LB&SCR.

Rouen's registered length was 250.6 ft (76.4 m), her beam was 29.1 ft (8.9 m) and her depth was 14.0 ft (4.3 m). Her tonnages were 838 GRT and 326 NRT. She had accommodation for 110 first class and 108 second class passengers.

Rouen was a sidewheel paddle steamer. She had a two-cylinder diagonal compound steam engine that was rated at 487 NHP and gave her a speed of 19 1/4 knots (35.7 km/h).

== Career ==
The LB&SCR registered Rouen in Newhaven. Her UK official number was 95353 and her code letters were LBHR. Her route was between Newhaven and Dieppe.

In 1903 James and Robert Little acquired her for the Barrow Steam Navigation Company, renamed her Duchess of Buccleuch, and registered her in Barrow. Her route was between Barrow and Douglas, Isle of Man. In 1907 the Midland Railway took over the Barrow SN Co. In 1909 the Midland withdrew Duchess of Buccleuch from service and she was scrapped.
