= USS Teaser (SP-933) =

Patrol vessel of the United States Navy

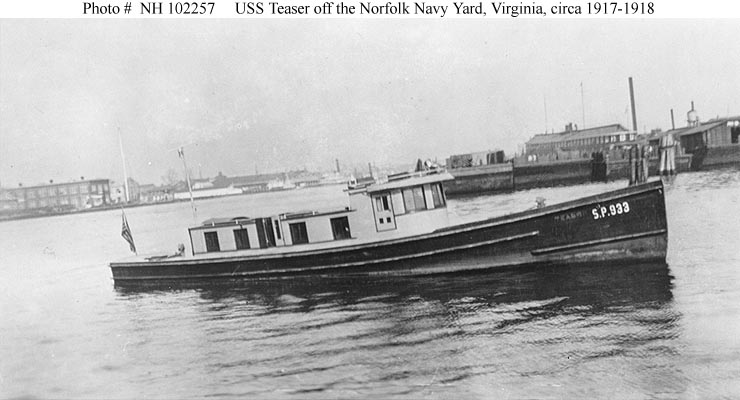
- USS Teaser (SP-933) in the Elizabeth River off the Norfolk Navy Yard, Portsmouth, Virginia, sometime between November 1917 and December 1918.

History

United States
- Name: USS Teaser
- Namesake: Previous name retained
- Builder: W. F. Dunn, Norfolk, Virginia
- Completed: 1916
- Acquired: November 1917
- Commissioned: 29 November 1917
- Out of service: 27 December 1918
- Stricken: 15 February 1919
- Fate: Burned due to engine backfire and sank 27 December 1918
- Notes: Operated as civilian motorboat Teaser 1916-1917

General characteristics
- Type: Section patrol vessel
- Displacement: 20 t (19.7 long tons; 22.0 short tons)
- Length: 60 ft 0 in (18.29 m)
- Beam: 12 ft 0 in (3.66 m)
- Draft: 2 ft 6 in (1 m) aft
- Installed power: 50 hp (37.3 kW)
- Propulsion: 1 × 4-cylinder Palmer gasoline engine; 1 × propeller
- Speed: 11.2 kn (20.7 km/h; 12.9 mph)
- Complement: 5
- Armament: 2 × 37 mm (1.5 in) 1-pounder autocannons
- Notes: Specifications from

The second USS Teaser (SP-933) was a United States Navy patrol vessel in commission from 1917 to 1918.

Teaser was built as a civilian wooden-hulled cabin launch of the same name in 1916 by W. F. Dunn at Norfolk, Virginia. In November 1917, the U.S. Navy acquired her from her owner, George Roper & Brother, for use as a section patrol vessel during World War I. She was commissioned as USS Teaser (SP-933) on 29 November 1917.

Assigned to the 5th Naval District, Teaser served on patrol duties in the Hampton Roads, Virginia, area for the rest of World War I and into December 1918. On 27 December 1918, an engine backfire started a fire aboard Teaser, and she burned and sank in Hampton Roads.

Teaser was stricken from the Navy List on 15 February 1919.
