= Port of Venice =

Port in Italy

Coordinates: 45°26′15″N 12°20′09″E

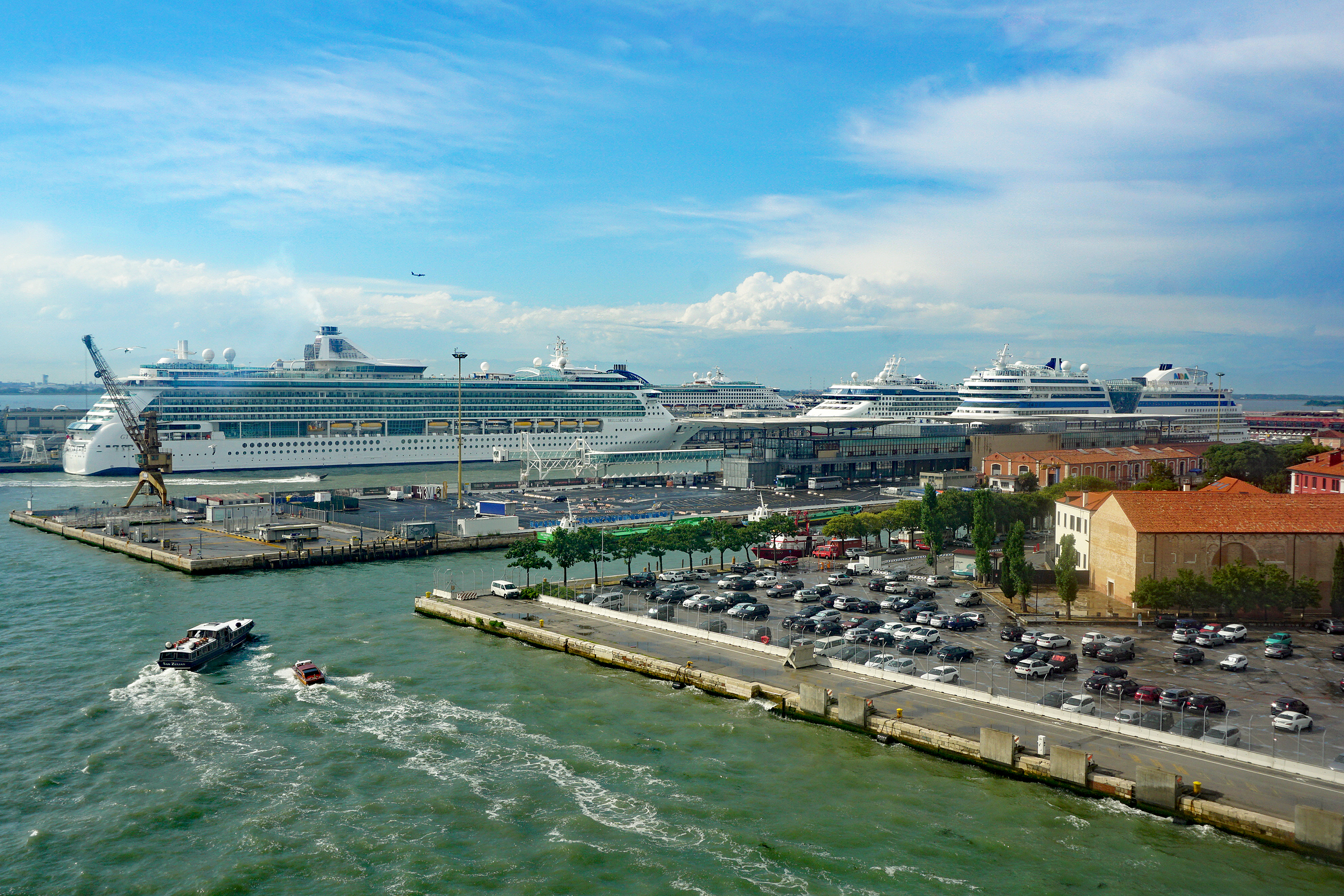
Cruise ships at the passenger terminal (Venezia Terminal Passeggeri) in the port of Venice

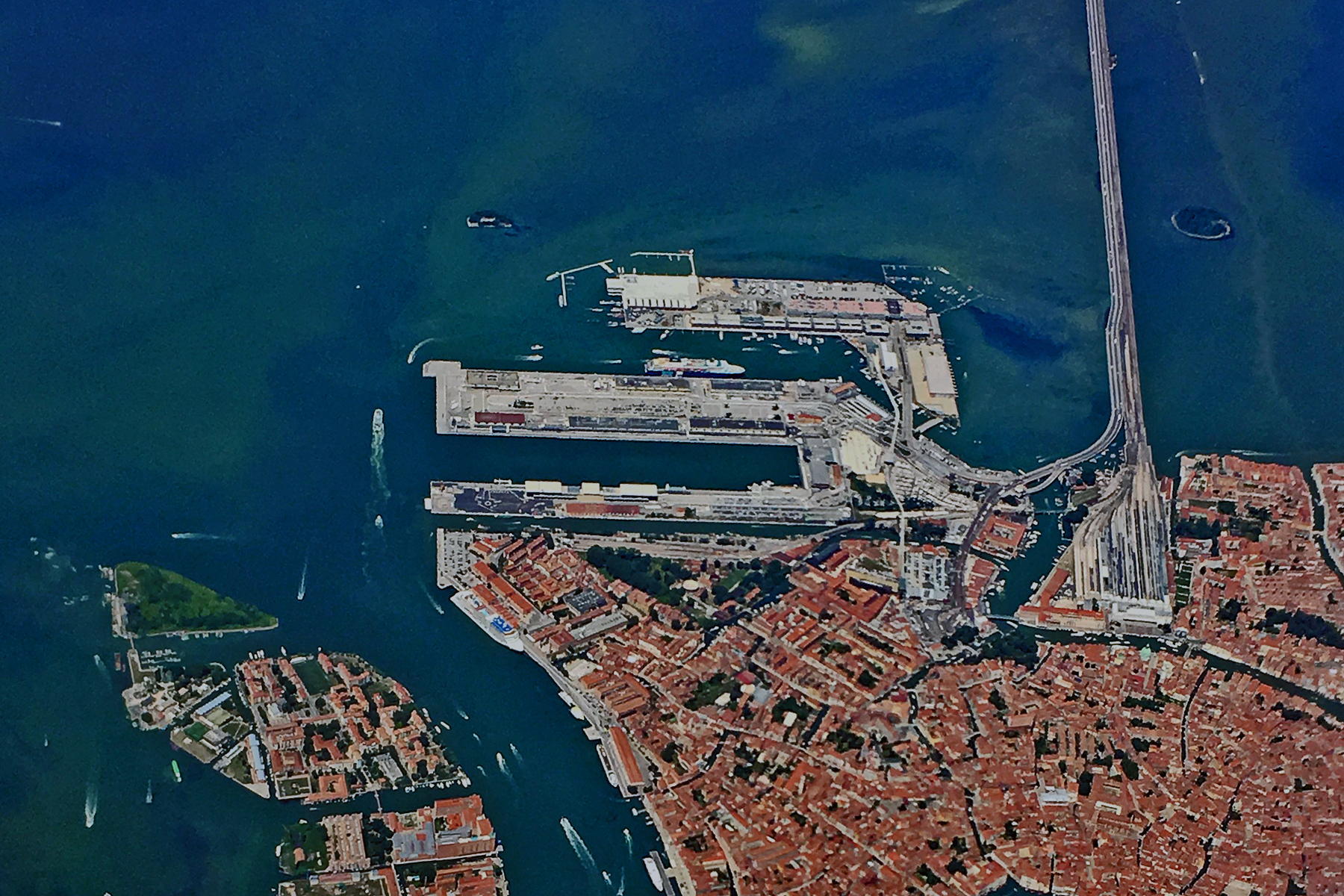
Aerial view of the cruise ship terminal (Venezia Terminal Passeggeri)

The Port of Venice (Italian: Porto di Venezia) is a port serving Venice, northeastern Italy. It is the eighth-busiest commercial port in Italy and was one of the most important in the Mediterranean concerning the cruise sector, as a major hub for cruise ships. It is one of the major Italian ports and is included in the list of the leading European ports which are located on the strategic nodes of trans-European networks. In 2006, 30,936,931 tonnes passed through the port, of which 14,541,961 was the commercial sector, and it saw 1,453,513 passengers. In 2002, the port handled 262,337 containers.

Michael Jackson planned to perform here at July 9, 1992 during his Dangerous World Tour, but these plans were cancelled.
