= TSS Duchess of Devonshire =

History
- Name: 1897–1928: Duchess of Devonshire; 1928–1949: Gibel Dersa
- Operator: 1897–1907: Barrow SN Co; 1907–1923: Midland Railway; 1923–1928: LMS Railway; 1928–1943: Bland Line; 1943–1947: Dalhousie Steam & Motor Ship Co; 1947–1949: A Benjamin & Co
- Port of registry: 1897: Barrow; 1928: Gibraltar; 1943: London; 1947: Gibraltar
- Builder: Naval and Armament Construction Company, Barrow
- Yard number: 255
- Launched: 21 January 1897
- Completed: March 1897
- Maiden voyage: 9 April 1897
- Out of service: 1949
- Fate: Scrapped 1949

General characteristics
- Tonnage: 1,265 GRT, 543 NRT
- Length: 300 feet (91 m)
- Beam: 35.1 feet (10.7 m)
- Draught: 15.7 feet (4.8 m)
- Decks: 2
- Installed power: 273 NHP
- Propulsion: 2 × screws; 2 × 3-cylinder triple-expansion engines
- Speed: 18 knots (33 km/h)
- Capacity: 1,250 passengers

TSS Duchess of Devonshire was a passenger ship built for the Barrow Steam Navigation Company in 1897.

== History ==
The Naval and Armament Construction Company of Barrow built Duchess of Devonshire as yard number 255 for the Barrow Steam Navigation Company. She was launched on 21 January 1897 by Louisa Cavendish, Duchess of Devonshire.

She had four decks – lower, main, promenade and shade. First class accommodation was amidships, with sleeping berths for 124 passengers. The promenade deck had fourteen staterooms, a smokeroom and bar, and first-class entrance, with staircase descending to the dining saloon on the main deck. The ladies’ saloon and staterooms were on the lower deck.

Her maiden voyage from Barrow to Belfast was on 9 April 1897 under the command of Captain Myerscough, in a journey time of just under six hours.

The Midland Railway bought her in 1907

In 1914 the Admiralty requisitioned her and had her converted into an armed boarding steamer. In 1919 she suffered a boiler explosion which killed three people. On 25 September 1922 she was involved in a minor collision with the coasting steamer Trevor which was between Laxey and Douglas.

In 1923 she passed to the London Midland and Scottish Railway, who in 1928 sold her to Bland Line of Gibraltar who renamed her Gibel Dersa. She was requisitioned in 1941. The Dalhousie Steam and Motor Ship Company of London bought her in 1943, and sold her in 1947 to A Benjamin and Company of Gibraltar. She was scrapped in 1949 at Malaga.
