= Barrow Steam Navigation Company =

British steamship company

The Barrow Steam Navigation Company was a steamship company, owned by the Midland Railway, Furness Railway, and James Little & Company. It was acquired by the Midland Railway in 1907.

It operated a number of ships, including:

- TSS City of Belfast (1893)
- PS Duchess of Buccleuch (1888)
- TSS Duchess of Devonshire (1897)
- PS Manx Queen (1880)
