= TSS City of Belfast =

History
- Name: 1893: City of Belfast; 1925: Nicolaos Togias; 1933: Kephallinia
- Owner: 1893: J Little & Co; 1906: Midland Railway; 1923: LMS Railway; 1925: Togias SS Co; 1930: Hellenic Coast Lines
- Operator: 1893: Barrow SN Co; 1914: (United Kingdom) Royal Navy; 1919: Midland Railway; 1925: EK Togias
- Port of registry: 1893: (United Kingdom) Barrow; 1925: (Greece) Syra; 1930: (Greece) Piraeus
- Builder: Laird Bros, Birkenhead
- Yard number: 590
- Launched: 7 January 1893
- Completed: April 1893
- Identification: UK official number 99938; 1893: code letters NCTD; 1925: code letters JFQP; 1934: call sign SVDK
- Fate: foundered 13 August 1941

General characteristics
- Type: passenger ferry
- Tonnage: 1894: 1,055 GRT, 320 NRT; 1919: 994 GRT, 395 NRT; 1927: 1,266 GRT, 460 NRT
- Length: 280.6 ft (85.5 m)
- Beam: 32.1 ft (9.8 m)
- Depth: 13.4 ft (4.1 m)
- Decks: 2
- Installed power: 193 NHP
- Propulsion: 2 × screws; 2 × triple-expansion engines
- Speed: 17 knots (31 km/h)

TSS City of Belfast was a passenger steamship that was built in England in 1893, renamed Nicolaos Togias in 1925, renamed Kephallinia in 1933 and sank in 1941. She was owned and registered in Britain until 1925, when she passed to Greek owners.

As City of Belfast, the ship was an armed boarding steamer for most of the First World War. As Kephallinia, she foundered during the Second World War en route from Alexandria to Tobruk.

== Building ==
Laird Brothers built the ship in Birkenhead on the River Mersey as yard number 590. She was launched on 7 January 1893 by Mrs Little, Mayoress of Barrow-in-Furness. The ship was completed that April. Her registered length was 280.6 ft (85.5 m), her beam was 32.1 ft (9.8 m) and her depth was 13.4 ft (4.1 m). Her tonnages were 1,055 GRT and 320 NRT.

City of Belfast had twin screws, each driven by a three-cylinder triple-expansion engine. Between them, her twin engines were rated at 193 NHP and gave her a speed of 17 knots (31 km/h).

== British service ==
Cit of Belfast's first owner was J Little & Co, and she was operated by the Barrow Steam Navigation Company. She was registered in Barrow. Her UK official number was 99938 and her code letters were NCTD. She was operated by the Barrow Steam Navigation Company, of which J Little & Co was a part owner.

By 1906 the Midland Railway acquired City of Belfast. The Midland was another of the owners of the Barrow SN Co, and in 1907 the Midland absorbed the Barrow SN Co entirely.

In October 1914 the Admiralty requisitioned City of Belfast and had her converted into an armed boarding steamer. She was returned to her owner in October 1919. By 1919 her tonnages had been revised to 994 GRT and 395 NRT. By 1920 she was equipped for wireless telegraphy.

On 1 January 1923 the Midland became part of the new London, Midland and Scottish Railway (LMS). In May 1925 the LMS sold City of Belfast.

== Greek service ==
The Togias Steam Ship Company bought the ship, renamed her Nicolaos Togias, and appointed EK Togias to manage her. Nicolaos Togias was registered on the island of Syra in the Aegean Sea. Her Greek code letters were JFQP.

In 1930 ownership passed to Hellenic Coast Lines, who renamed the ship Kephallinia and registered her in Piraeus. By 1934 the call sign SVDK had replaced her Greek code letters.

== Loss ==
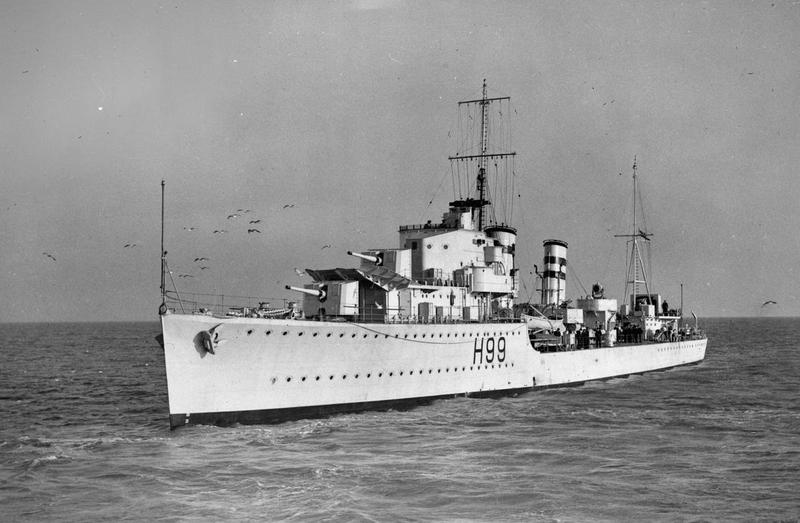
HMS Hero, which rescued Kephallinia's crew in August 1941

In April 1941 Germany invaded Greece, but Kephallinia escaped. On 13 August she left Alexandria in Egypt with supplies for the Allied force holding Tobruk in Libya. However, her cargo shifted, and she foundered in the Mediterranean off the Egyptian coast. The Royal Navy destroyer HMS Hero rescued Kephallinia's entire crew, and there was no loss of life.
