= SMS Leopard (1917) =

British cargo ship that was converted into a German commerce raider

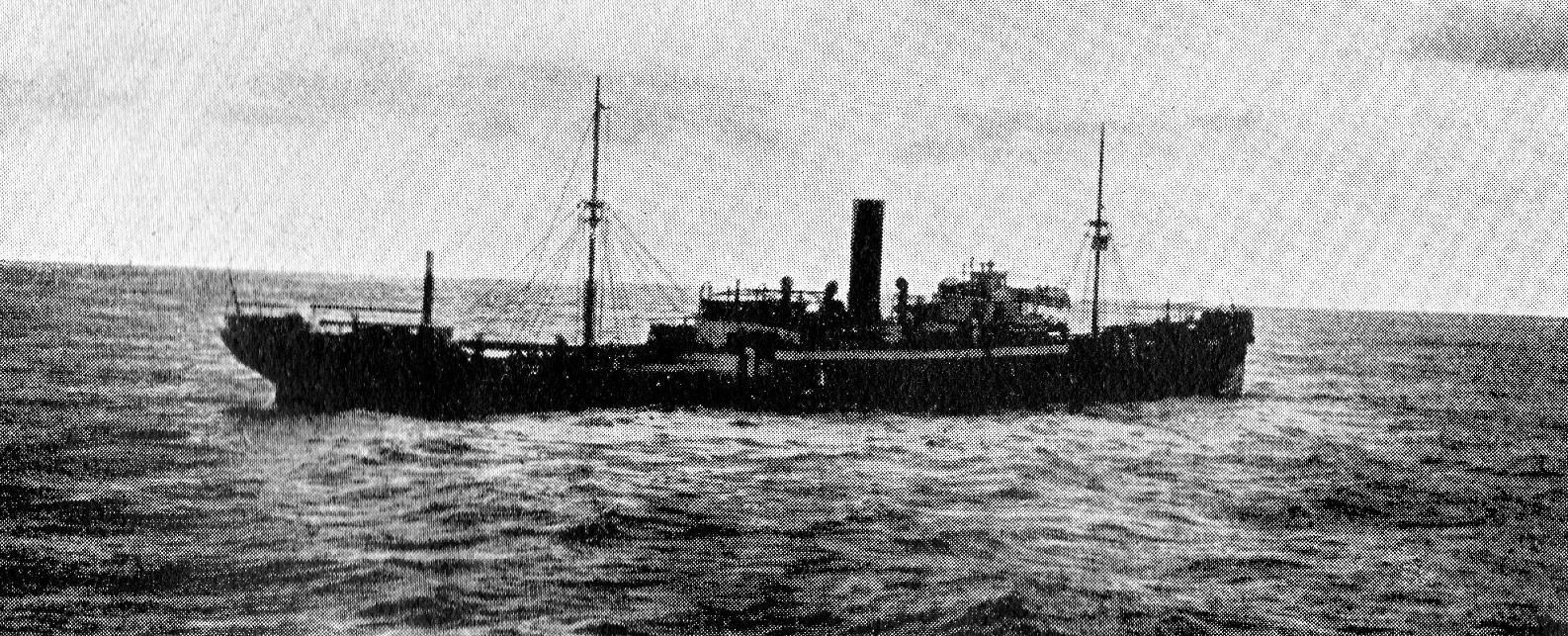
- SMS Leopard

History
- Name: 1912: Yarrowdale; 1917: Leopard
- Namesake: 1912: the valley of Yarrow Water
- Owner: Mackill Steamship Co
- Operator: 1912: Robert Mackill & Co; 1917: (German Empire) Imperial German Navy
- Port of registry: 1912: (United Kingdom) Glasgow
- Builder: Wm Dobson & Co, Walker
- Yard number: 178
- Launched: 3 May 1912
- Completed: June 1912
- Commissioned: into German Navy: 9 January 1917
- Identification: UK official number 133049; code letters HWBR
- Captured: by SMS Möwe, 11 December 1916
- Fate: sunk by gunfire, 16 March 1917

General characteristics
- Type: cargo ship
- Tonnage: 4,652 GRT, 2,914 NRT
- Displacement: 9,800 tons
- Length: 390.2 ft (118.9 m)
- Beam: 52.0 ft (15.8 m)
- Depth: 26.6 ft (8.1 m)
- Decks: 2
- Installed power: 429 NHP
- Propulsion: single screw; triple expansion engine
- Speed: 13 knots (24 km/h)
- Complement: as auxiliary cruiser: 319
- Armament: 1917: 2 × torpedo tubes; 5 × 15 cm SK L/40 naval guns; 4 × 8.8 cm SK L/45 naval guns

SMS Leopard was a British cargo steamship that was built in 1912 as Yarrowdale, captured in 1916 by the Imperial German Navy, converted into a commerce raider in Germany, and sunk with all hands by the Royal Navy in 1917.

Yarrowdale's British operator was Robert Mackill & Co of Glasgow, who gave this name to at least three different ships. This was the second of the three.

Leopard was the last commerce raider that Germany sent out in the First World War. After the Royal Navy sank her, Germany relied entirely on U-boats to sink Allied merchant ships.

== Building ==
William Dobson & Co built Yarrowdale at Walker, Newcastle upon Tyne as yard number 178. She was launched on 3 May 1912 and completed that June. Her registered length was 390.2 ft (118.9 m), her beam was 52.0 ft (15.8 m) and her depth was 26.6 ft (8.1 m). She had two decks. Her tonnages were 4,652 GRT, 2,914 NRT, and 9,800 tons displacement. Yarrowdale had a single screw, driven by a three-cylinder triple expansion steam engine that was rated at 429 NHP and gave her a speed of 13 knots (24 km/h).

== Yarrowdale ==
The Mackill Steamship Company owned Yarrowdale and Robert Mackill and Company managed her. She was registered in Glasgow. Her UK official number was 133049 and her code letters were HWBR.

On 11 December 1916 the German commerce raider SMS Möwe captured Yarrowdale in the Atlantic Ocean. Möwe's commander, KK Nikolaus zu Dohna-Schlodien, saw Yarrowdale's potential for conversion into a commerce raider. He put a German prize crew and 400 interned Allied seafarers aboard her, and she evaded Allied Blockade to reach Germany.

== Leopard ==
Kaiserliche Werft Kiel converted Yarrowdale into the commerce raider Leopard. She was armed with five 15 cm SK L/40 naval guns, four 8.8 cm SK L/45 naval guns and two torpedo tubes, all concealed. She was disguised as Rena, a cargo ship that had been built in England in 1911 for owners in neutral Norway, and whose size and appearance was similar to Yarrowdale's. This was the second time that Germany had disguised a commerce raider as Rena. The first was SMS Greif a year earlier, which HMS Alcantara sank before she had a chance to attack any Allied shipping.

On 9 January Leopard was commissioned into the German Navy under the command of KK Hans von Laffert. Her complement was 319 officers and ratings. She passed through the Little Belt on 7 March 1917, and then through the Kattegat, Skagerrak and North Sea.

== Loss ==
By 16 March Leopard was in the Norwegian Sea, where at 1145 hrs the armoured cruiser HMS Achilles and armed boarding steamer Dundee sighted her. At 1400 hrs Achilles overtook Leopard, ordered her to stop, and sent Dundee to inspect her. Dundee lowered a boat, in which she sent a boarding party of an officer and five ratings to inspect Leopard.

Leopard kept trying to turn broadside-on to Dundee, ready to bring her concealed guns to bear. Dundee kept trying to keep astern of Leopard to prevent this. Dundee's commander suspected that Leopard had twin screws, and was using them to turn the ship. However, this was not the case.

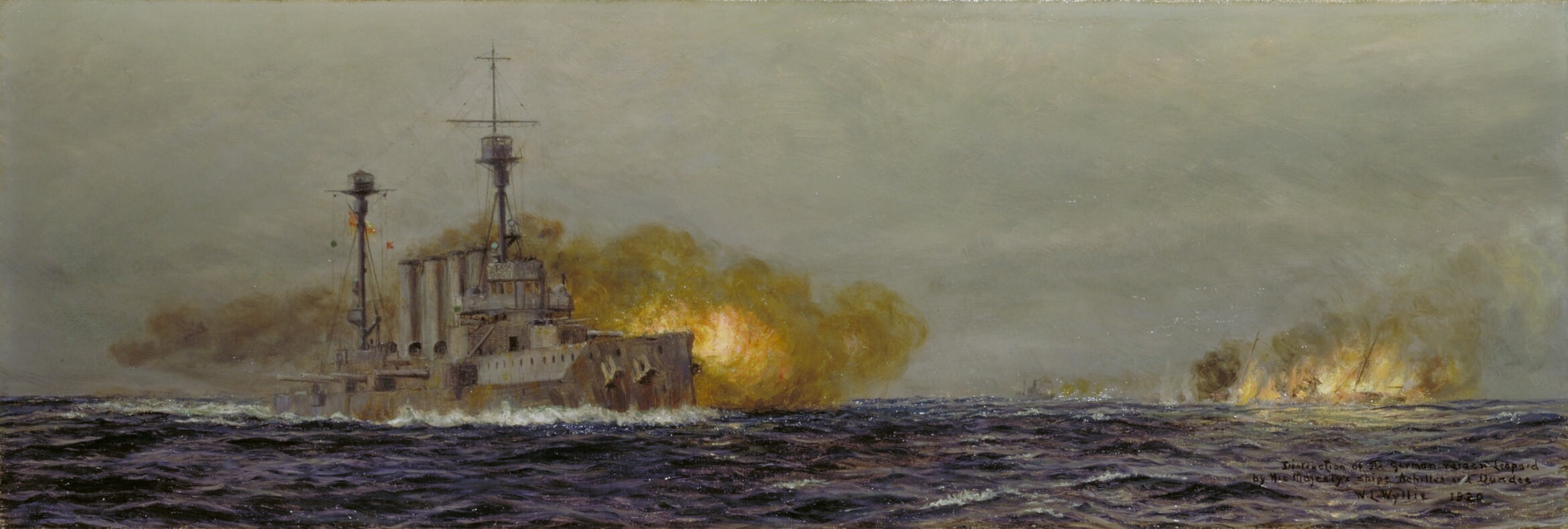
Painting by WL Wyllie, RA, of HMS Achilles (left) firing at Leopard (right). HMS Dundee is the small grey shape just to the left of Leopard.

At 1540 or 1545 hrs Leopard opened her port gun ports, revealing her guns. Dundee immediately opened fire at a range of about 1,000 yd (910 m). The British ship's two 4-inch (102 mm) guns immediately hit Leopard's gun deck and engine room, while her one 3-pounder gun aimed at her bridge. Achilles opened fire at a range of 5,300 yd (4,800 m). Dundee fired 44 4-inch shells and 25 3-pounder shells before the German ship fired her first shot.

Leopard then fired three salvoes at Dundee. The first two fell short, and the third overshot. Thereafter, Leopard's guns fired only singly. None of the shots hit Dundee, except with fragments of shrapnel. Leopard also fired three torpedoes at Dundee, but all missed.

At 1615 hrs Dundee ran out of ammunition. Achilles continued firing. Leopard was on fire throughout, but one of her guns kept firing. At 1633 or 1635 hrs Leopard listed to port and sank with all hands: 319 officers and men. The six Dundee's boarding party were reported missing; presumed captured by Leopard and killed either in the British bombardment or when the German raider sank.

== Aftermath ==
Soon after the action a bottle was found, containing a message purporting to be from a member of Leopard's crew who had thrown it overboard during the engagement. It bore the time and place and read "In action with British cruiser. Fighting for the glory and honour of Germany. A last greeting to our relatives."

After Leopard was sunk, only days into her first patrol, Germany ceased trying to send surface raiders to attack Allied shipping. The German Navy had resumed unrestricted submarine warfare on 1 February, and after Möwe returned to port on 22 March, Germany relied on U-boats alone to sink Allied shipping.

== Bibliography ==
- Halpern, Paul (1994). A Naval History of World War I. Annapolis, MD: Naval Institute Press. ISBN 978-0870212666.
- Hoyt, Edwin (1970). The Elusive Seagull, The Adventures of World War One German Minelayer, the Moewe. London: Leslie Frewin. ISBN 978-0091015701.
- Lloyd's Register of British and Foreign Shipping. Vol. II.–Steamers. London: Lloyd's Register of Shipping. 1912 – via Internet Archive.
- Mercantile Navy List. London. 1913 – via Crew List Index Project.
- Schmalenbach, Paul (1977). German Raiders: A history of auxiliary cruisers of the German Navy, 1895-1945. London: Patrick Stephens Ltd. ISBN 978-0850593518.
