= HMS Achilles (1905) =

British Warrior-class armoured cruiser

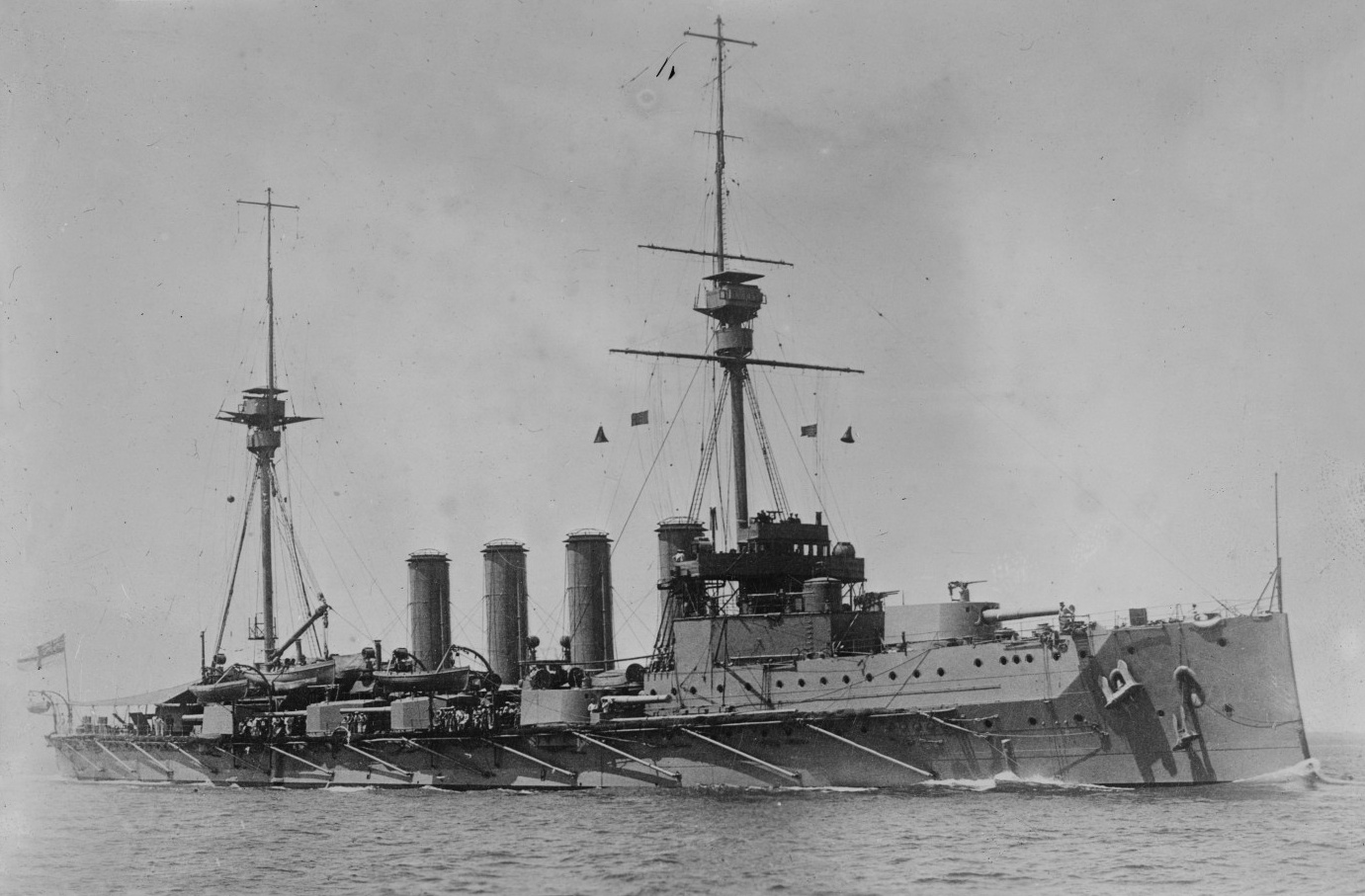
- HMS Achilles

History

United Kingdom
- Name: HMS Achilles
- Namesake: Achilles
- Builder: Armstrong Whitworth, Elswick
- Laid down: 22 February 1904
- Launched: 17 June 1905
- Completed: 22 April 1907
- Reclassified: Training ship, 1918
- Fate: Sold for scrap, 9 May 1921

General characteristics
- Class & type: Warrior-class armoured cruiser
- Displacement: 13,550 long tons (13,770 t) (normal); 14,500 long tons (14,700 t) (deep load)
- Length: 505 ft 4 in (154.0 m)
- Beam: 73 ft 6 in (22.4 m)
- Draught: 27 ft 6 in (8.4 m) (maximum)
- Installed power: 23,650 ihp (17,640 kW)
- Propulsion: 2 shafts, 4-cylinder triple-expansion steam engines; 19 Yarrow water-tube boilers and 6 cylindrical boilers
- Speed: 23 knots (43 km/h; 26 mph)
- Range: 7,960 nmi (14,740 km; 9,160 mi) at 10 knots (19 km/h; 12 mph)
- Complement: 712
- Armament: 6 × 1 - BL 9.2-inch (234 mm) Mk X guns; 4 × 1 - BL 7.5-inch (191 mm) Mk II or Mk V guns; 26 × 1 - QF 3-pounder (47 mm) guns; 3 × 1 - submerged 18-inch (450 mm) torpedo tubes
- Armour: Belt: 3–6 in (76–152 mm); Decks: 0.75–1.5 in (19–38 mm); Barbettes: 3–6 in (76–152 mm); Turrets: 4.5–7.5 in (110–190 mm); Conning tower: 10 in (250 mm); Bulkheads: 2–6 in (51–152 mm)

HMS Achilles was a Warrior-class armoured cruiser built for the Royal Navy in the first decade of the 20th century. She served with the 2nd Cruiser Squadron for most of the First World War. The ship did not participate in the Battle of Jutland in 1916, but did sink the German raider Leopard in 1917. Achilles became a training ship in 1918 and was sold for scrap in 1921.

== General description ==
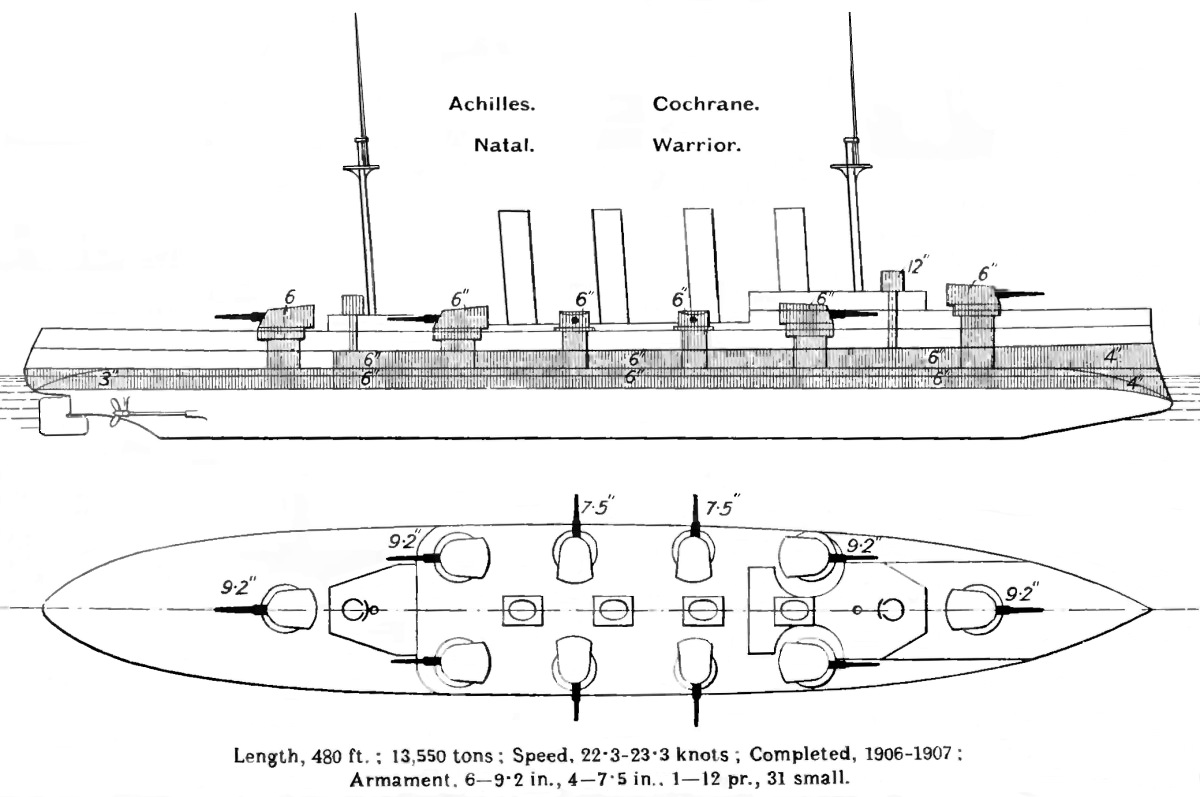
Right elevation and plan view from Brassey's Naval Annual; the shaded areas show her armouring

Achilles displaced 13,550 long tons (13,770 t) as built and 14,500 long tons (14,700 t) fully loaded. The ship had an overall length of 505 feet 4 inches (154.0 m), a beam of 73 feet 6 inches (22.4 m) and a draught of 27 feet 6 inches (8.4 m). She was powered by four-cylinder triple-expansion steam engines, driving two shafts, which developed a total of 23,650 indicated horsepower (17,640 kW) and gave a maximum speed of 23.3 knots (43.2 km/h; 26.8 mph). The engines were powered by 19 Yarrow water-tube boilers and six cylindrical boilers. The ship carried a maximum of 2,050 long tons (2,080 t) of coal and an additional 600 long tons (610 t) of fuel oil that was sprayed on the coal to increase its burn rate. At full capacity, she could steam for 7,960 nautical miles (14,740 km; 9,160 mi) at a speed of 10 knots (19 km/h; 12 mph).

=== Armament ===
Her main armament consisted of six BL 9.2-inch (234 mm) Mark X guns in single Mk V turrets distributed in two centerline turrets (one each fore and one aft) and four turrets disposed in the corners about the funnels. Her secondary armament of four BL 7.5-inch (191 mm) Mark II or Mark V guns in single Mk II turrets was carried amidships, between the wing 9.2-inch guns. Twenty-six Vickers QF 3-pounders were fitted, ten on turret roofs and eight each on the forward and aft superstructures. The last four ships of the Duke of Edinburgh-class cruisers had a secondary armament of turreted 7.5-inch guns rather than the 6-inch (152 mm) guns in open barbettes of the first two ships; these latter four were sometimes referred to as the Warrior class. Because of the extra topweight of the turrets in comparison to their half-sisters their stability was reduced which made them very good seaboats and steady gun platforms because they did not roll as much. The ship also mounted three submerged 18-inch (457 mm) torpedo tubes, one of which was mounted in the stern.

=== Wartime modifications ===
A single Hotchkiss QF 6-pounder anti-aircraft gun on a high-angle Mark Ic mounting was mounted on the quarterdeck in 1915. It had a maximum depression of 8° and a maximum elevation of 60°. The gun fired a 6-pound (2.7 kg) shell at a muzzle velocity of 1,765 ft/s (538 m/s) at a rate of fire of 20 rounds per minute. They had a maximum ceiling of 10,000 ft (3,000 m), but an effective range of only 1,200 yards (1,100 m). Achilles's foremast was converted to a tripod mast to support the weight of a fire-control director after the Battle of Jutland in 1916, but when the director was actually fitted is not known.

== Construction and career ==
Achilles was ordered as part of the 1903–04 naval construction programme as the third of four armoured cruisers. She was laid down on 22 February 1904 at Elswick by Armstrong Whitworth. The ship was launched on 17 June 1905 and completed on 22 April 1907 at the cost of £1,191,103. Like her sister ships, she joined the 5th Cruiser Squadron in 1907, and made a port visit to Russia in 1908. The ship was later transferred to the 2nd Cruiser Squadron in 1909. Achilles, accompanied by her sister Cochrane, and three other armoured cruisers were sent to reinforce the defences of the Shetland Islands on 2 August 1914, days before the start of the First World War. She, and her squadron, was assigned to the Grand Fleet after the beginning of the war.

Achilles missed the Battle of Jutland on 31 May 1916 because she was refitting. On the evening of 18 August, the Grand Fleet put to sea in response to a deciphered message that the High Seas Fleet, minus the II Battle Squadron, would be leaving harbour that night. The Germans planned to bombard the port of Sunderland on 19 August, with extensive reconnaissance provided by airships and submarines. The Germans broke off their planned attack to pursue a lone British battle squadron reported by an airship, which was in fact the Harwich Force under Commodore Tyrwhitt. Realising their mistake, the Germans then set course for home. During the Grand Fleet's sortie, Achilles spotted a U-boat. During another sortie by the High Seas Fleet on 18 October 1916, Achilles and three other armoured cruisers were ordered to patrol the northern end of the North Sea, between the approaches to Pentland Firth and Hardangerfjord in Norway, but they saw no German ships.

On 16 March 1917, Achilles and the armed boarding steamer Dundee were patrolling north of the Shetland Islands when they encountered the disguised German auxiliary cruiser Leopard. The latter ship heaved to when commanded, but manoeuvred to prevent Dundee from boarding her and then fired two torpedoes which missed. Dundee retaliated by raking Leopard's stern, badly damaging the German ship and then Achilles opened fire herself. The German ship sank an hour later with no survivors. Achilles was transferred to the North America and West Indies Station in August 1917 for convoy escort duties, but returned to Britain for a refit between February and December 1918. Upon completion of this refit Achilles became a stoker's training ship at Chatham. The ship was sold for scrap on 9 May 1921.
