= TSS Wyvern =

History
- Name: 1905–1960: TSS Wyvern
- Operator: 1905–1923: Midland Railway; 1923–1948: London, Midland and Scottish Railway; 1948–1960: British Railways
- Port of registry: (United Kingdom)
- Builder: Ferguson Shipbuilders, Port Glasgow
- Yard number: 164
- Launched: 10 October 1905
- Out of service: June 1960
- Fate: Scrapped 1970

General characteristics
- Tonnage: 215 gross register tons (GRT)
- Length: 110 feet (34 m)
- Beam: 22.5 feet (6.9 m)
- Draught: 11.1 feet (3.4 m)

TSS Wyvern was a passenger vessel built for the Midland Railway in 1905.

== History ==
TSS Wyvern was built by Ferguson Shipbuilders, Port Glasgow for the Midland Railway. She was launched on 10 October 1905. She was named the Wyvern after the company crest of the Midland Railway.

She was used for pleasure excursions from Heysham to Fleetwood until 1939. She was acquired by the London Midland and Scottish Railway in 1923 and British Railways in 1960. and disposed of in 1970.
