= PS Duchess of Edinburgh (1880) =

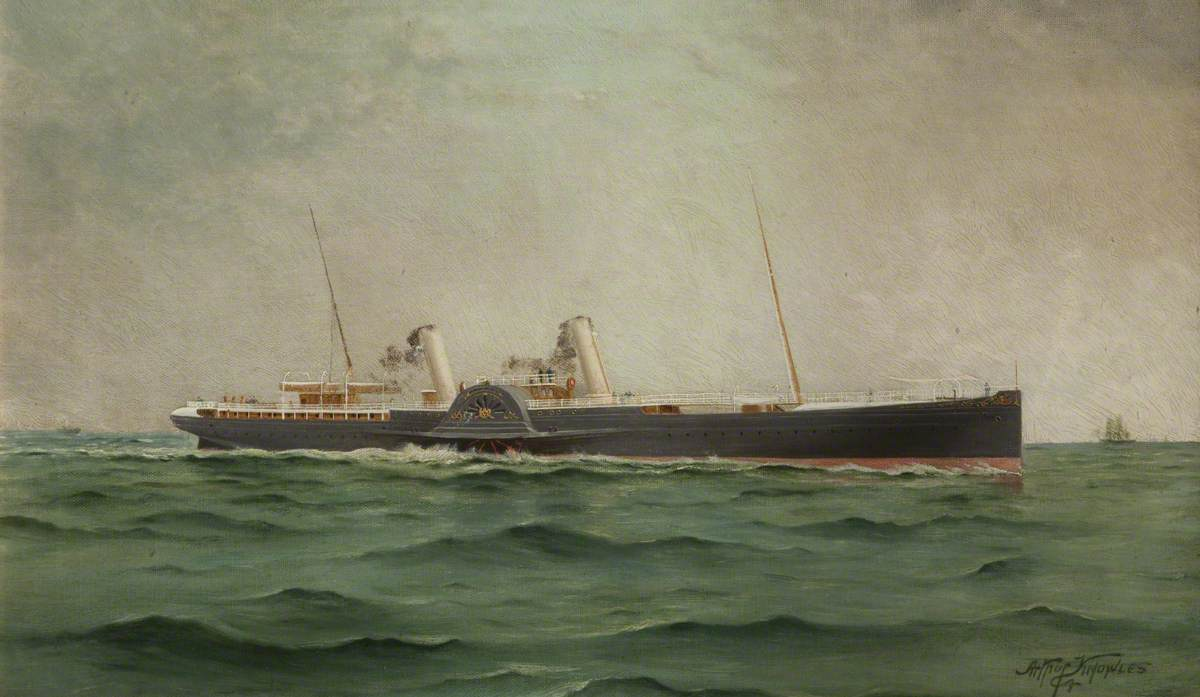
- Painting by Arthur Knowles, believed to be of Manx Queen

History

United Kingdom
- Name: 1880: Duchess of Edinburgh; 1883: Manx Queen
- Owner: 1880: South Eastern Railway; 1882: James Little & Co; 1905: Midland Railway
- Operator: 1883: Barrow SN Co
- Port of registry: 1880: London; 1883: Barrow
- Route: 1883: Barrow – Douglas; 1888: Dover – Ostend
- Builder: J&G Thompson, Clydebank
- Yard number: 181
- Launched: 23 July 1880
- Out of service: November 1907
- Identification: UK official number 82798; code letters TNGM
- Fate: Scrapped

General characteristics
- Type: passenger ferry
- Tonnage: 1880: 812 GRT, 368 NRT; 1883: 1,129 GRT, 568 NRT
- Length: 1880: 250.2 ft (76.3 m); 1883: 278.9 ft (85.0 m)
- Beam: 29.7 ft (9.1 m)
- Depth: 14.1 ft (4.3 m)
- Decks: 2
- Installed power: 400 NHP
- Propulsion: 2-cylinder compound engine

The PS Duchess of Edinburgh was a passenger ferry that was built in Glasgow for the South Eastern Railway Company (SER) in 1880. In 1883 James Little & Co acquired her for the Barrow Steam Navigation Company and renamed her Manx Queen. She passed to the Midland Railway in 1907 and was scrapped that same year.

== Building ==
J&G Thompson built Duchess of Edinburgh as yard number 181 at Clydebank, Glasgow. She was launched on 23 July 1880.

As built, the ship's registered length was 250.2 ft (76.3 m), her beam was 29.7 ft (9.1 m) and her depth was 14.1 ft (4.3 m). Her tonnages were 812 GRT and 368 NRT. She was a sidewheel paddle steamer with a two-cylinder compound steam engine that was rated at 400 NHP.

== Career ==
The SER registered Duchess of Edinburgh at London. Her official number was 82798 and her code letters were TNGM.

She entered service but failed to reach her contracted design speed, and was returned to her builders. She re-entered service in May 1881 but broke a paddle wheel after only five days and was returned to her builders again. The SER laid her up, first at Folkestone and then at Sheerness.

In 1883 James Little & Co bought the ship for the Barrow Steam Navigation Company. She was lengthened to 278.9 ft (85.0 m), which increased her tonnages to 1,129 GRT and 568 NRT. She was renamed Manx Queen and registered in Barrow. In 1888 the Belgian state railway chartered her for service between Dover and Ostend.

In 1907 the Midland Railway took over the Barrow Steam Navigation Company. That November she was sold to JJ King & Co, who scrapped her at Garston, Liverpool.
