= HMS E31 =

British E class submarine

History

United Kingdom
- Name: E31
- Builder: Scotts, Greenock
- Laid down: December 1914
- Launched: 23 August 1915
- Commissioned: 8 January 1916
- Fate: Sold, 6 September 1922

General characteristics
- Class & type: E-class submarine
- Displacement: 662 long tons (673 t) surfaced; 807 long tons (820 t) submerged
- Length: 181 ft (55 m)
- Beam: 15 ft (4.6 m)
- Propulsion: 2 × 800 hp (597 kW) diesel; 2 × 420 hp (313 kW) electric; 2 screws
- Speed: 15 knots (28 km/h; 17 mph) surfaced; 10 knots (19 km/h; 12 mph) submerged
- Range: 3,000 nmi (5,600 km) at 10 kn (19 km/h; 12 mph) surfaced; 65 nmi (120 km) at 5 kn (9.3 km/h; 5.8 mph) surfaced
- Complement: 31
- Armament: 5 × 18 inch (450 mm) torpedo tubes (2 bow, 2 beam, 1 stern); 1 × 12-pounder gun

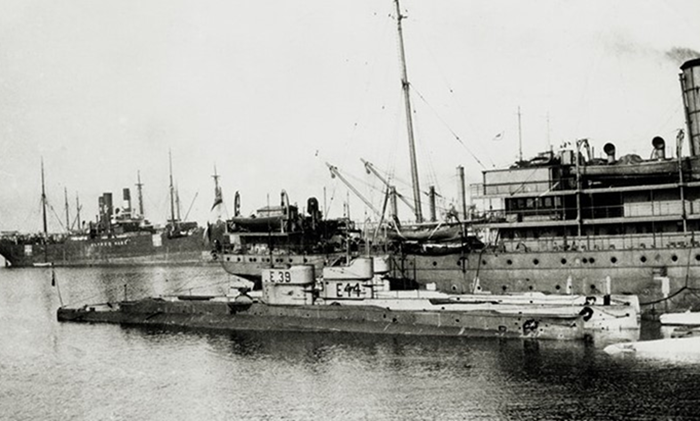
HMS E31 Is Behind HMS E44 In This Picture. E31 Is Covered By E44.

HMS E31 was a British E-class submarine built by Scotts, Greenock. She was laid down in December 1914, commissioned on 8 January 1916, and sold for scrap on 6 September 1922.

== Design ==
Like all post-E8 British E-class submarines, E31 had a displacement of 662 long tons (673 t) at the surface and 807 long tons (820 t) while submerged. She had a total length of 180 feet (55 m) and a beam of 22 feet 8.5 inches (6.922 m). She was powered by two 800 horsepower (600 kW) Vickers eight-cylinder two-stroke diesel engines and two 420 horsepower (310 kW) electric motors. The submarine had a maximum surface speed of 16 knots (30 km/h; 18 mph) and a submerged speed of 10 knots (19 km/h; 12 mph). British E-class submarines had fuel capacities of 50 long tons (51 t) of diesel and ranges of 3,255 miles (5,238 km; 2,829 nmi) when travelling at 10 knots (19 km/h; 12 mph). E31 was capable of operating submerged for five hours when travelling at 5 knots (9.3 km/h; 5.8 mph).

E31 was armed with a 12-pounder 76 mm (3.0 in) QF gun mounted forward of the conning tower. She had five 18 inch (450 mm) torpedo tubes, two in the bow, one either side amidships, and one in the stern; a total of 10 torpedoes were carried.

E-Class submarines had wireless systems with 1 kilowatt (1.3 hp) power ratings; in some submarines, these were later upgraded to 3 kilowatts (4.0 hp) systems by removing a midship torpedo tube. Their maximum design depth was 100 feet (30 m) although in service some reached depths of below 200 feet (61 m). Some submarines contained Fessenden oscillator systems.

== Crew ==
Her complement was three officers and 28 men.

== Service history ==
HMS E31 was involved in a curious incident when she was operating with the sea plane carrier Engadine in the North Sea in an air raid on the Zeppelin sheds at Tondern on 4 May 1916. While on a mission, LZ 32 was spotted by light cruisers HMS Galatea and HMS Phaeton who opened fire on the airship. Just as they were doing this HMS E31 was operating with the sea plane carrier Engadine in the North Sea in an air raid on the Zeppelin sheds at Tondern on 4 May 1916. E31 surfaced and spotted the airship, but being vulnerable on the surface, the sub dived to avoid attack. When the submarine put its periscope up, it observed that the Zeppelin was losing altitude after being hit by shells from Galatea and Phaeton. E31 then surfaced just in time to get in the fatal shot and brought the Zeppelin down. HMS E31 then proceeded to rescue seven survivors from the crew of LZ 32.

== Bibliography ==
- Foley, Michael (2013). Pioneers of Aerial Combat: Air Battles of the First World War. Pen and Sword. ISBN 9781473828520.
- Hobbs, David (2017). The Royal Navy's Air Service in the Great War. Casemate Publishers. ISBN 9781848323506.
- Hutchinson, Robert (2001). Jane's Submarines: War Beneath the Waves from 1776 to the Present Day. London: HarperCollins. ISBN 978-0-00-710558-8. OCLC 53783010.
- Wilson, Michael (1988). Destination Dardanelles: The Story of HMS E7. Pen and Sword. ISBN 9781473813557.
