= Franz Stabbert =

Swiss/German Kapitänleutnant and commander

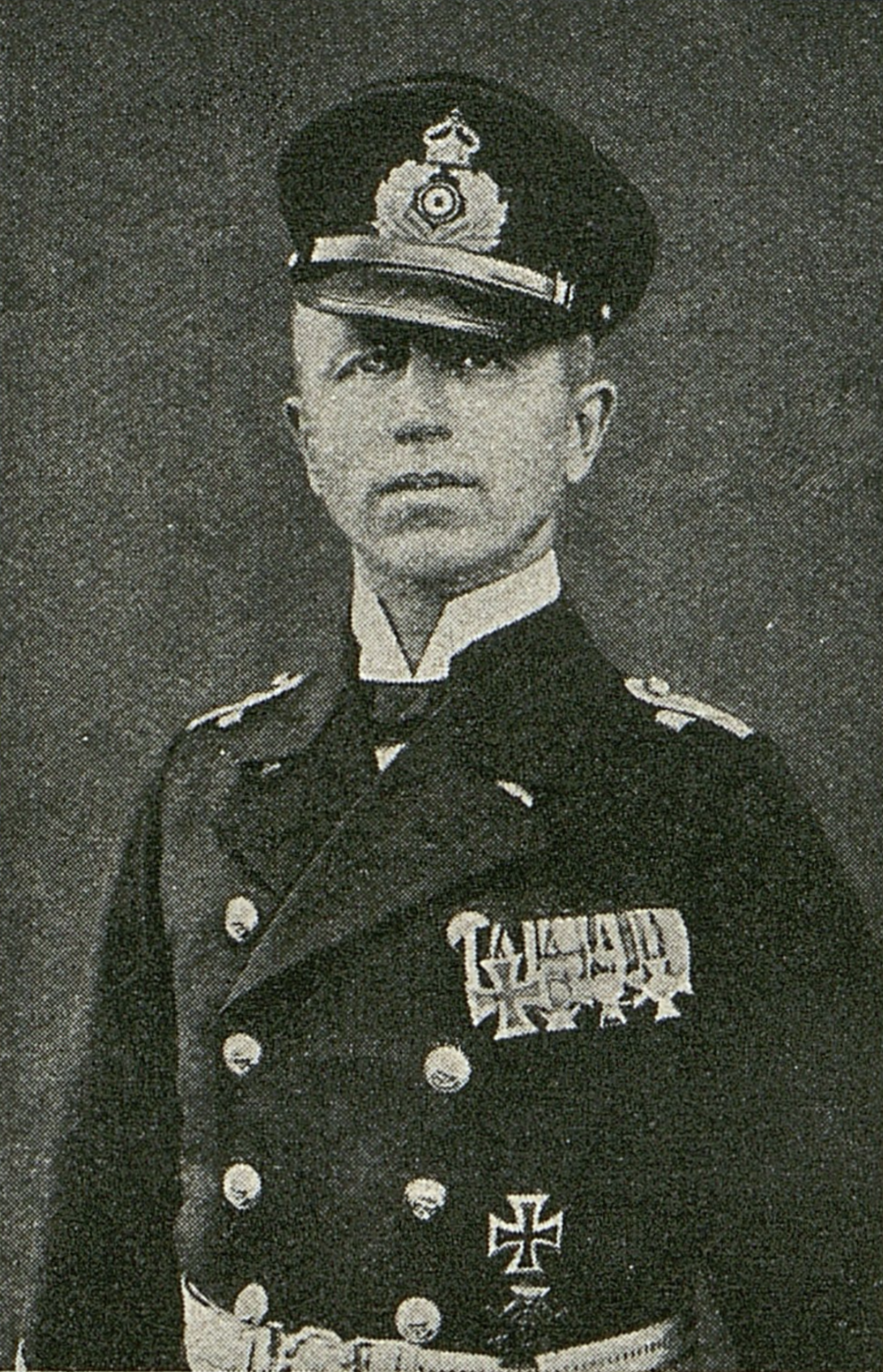
- Franz Stabbert (c. 1917)
- Born: 13 February 1881; Kulm, Switzerland
- Died: 20 October 1917 (aged 36); Lorraine, France
- Military career
- Allegiance: (German Empire) Germany
- Branch: German Kaiserliche Marine
- Service years: 1915 – 1917
- Rank: Kapitänleutnant
- Commands: See Commands
- Conflicts: World War I

Kapitänleutnant Franz Stabbert (born 13 February 1881 in Kulm – died 20 October 1917 in Lorraine) was a Kapitänleutnant of the German Kaiserliche Marine. He is most known for being the commander of the doomed LZ 93 during the First World War.

== Commands ==
Stabbert joined the German Kaiserliche Marine in 1915 and was stationed in Tønder. He received his first command of a zeppelin that same year on board LZ 32, which he commanded from 5 September 1915 to 16 November 1915 and on which he completed 20 flights. His next command was on LZ 59, which he commanded from 29 December 1915 until the ship's demise on 3 May 1916, on which he completed 16 flights, including 2 raids on England and 10 reconnaissance missions. After the crash of his ship in Norway, killing 3 crew, Stabbert was arrested but fled after 6 months of internment and returned to the airship base in Tønder on 20 December 1916. After his ordeal, he was given the command of LZ 66, which he commanded from 20 December 1916 to 23 January 1917 and on which he completed 2 flights. His last command was of LZ 93, which he commanded from 5 April 1917 until the ship's demise on 20 October 1917 and on which he completed 22 flights.

== Death ==
Stabbert was in command of LZ 93 when he took off from Tønder on the night of 19 October 1917 to participate in a so-called silent raid over England with 10 other airships. After completing its mission the LZ 93 set course for Tønder to head home on the morning of 20 October 1917. The ship, however, came in trouble over France near Chenevières as it was passing a storm. The ship climbed to a height of 6 km in an attempt to outflee the storm, but suddenly the ship was hit by antiaircraft fire from the French army-artillery 174th section of Chenevières and Saint-Clément southeast of Lunéville in the department of Meurthe-et-Moselle and the region Lorraine (southeast of Nancy).

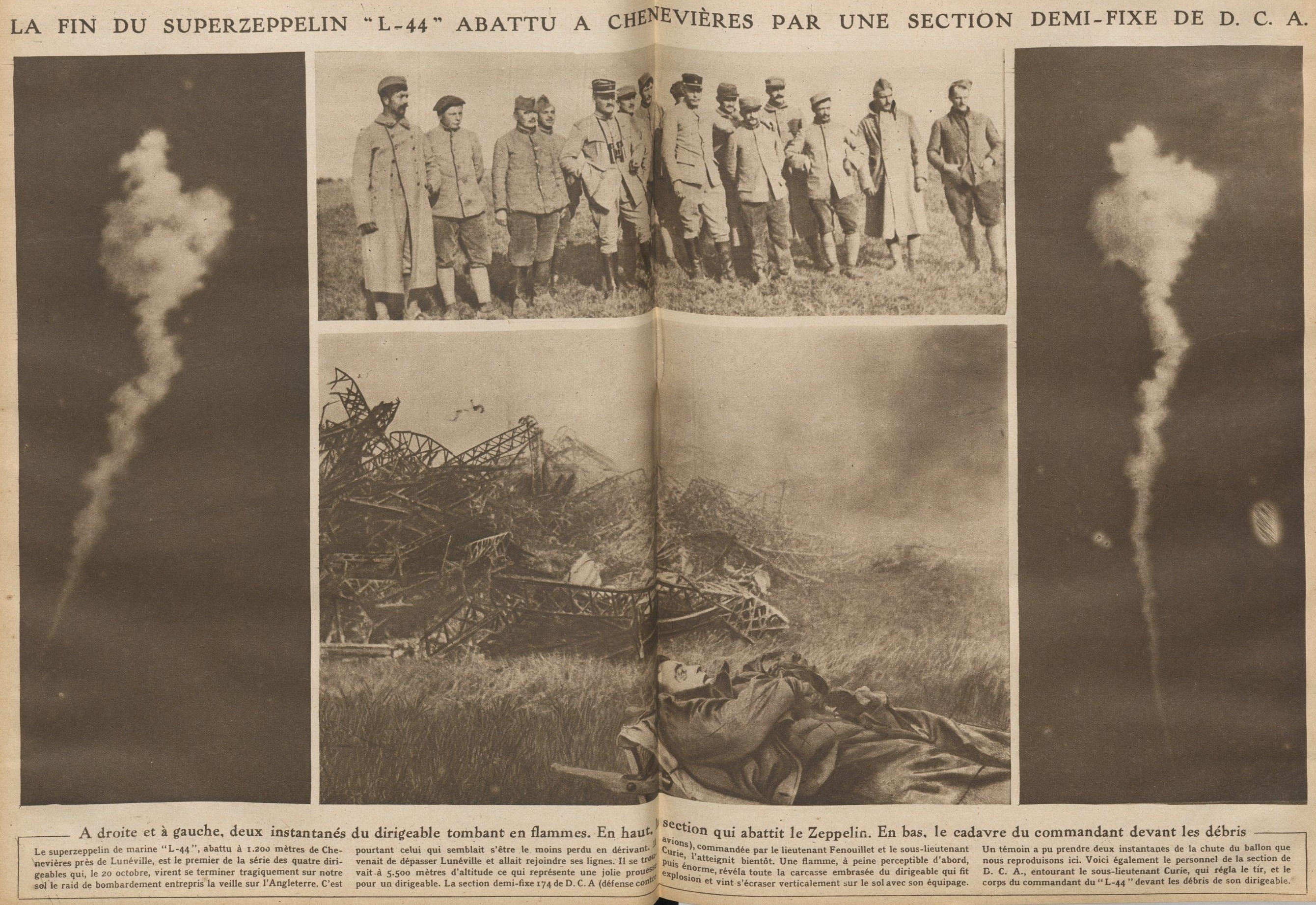
The pictures of the crashing LZ 93 and its wreckage together with the French unit that brought her down

After being hit, the ship caught fire and ultimately the hydrogen-filled gas cells exploded before the ship plunged nearly completely vertically to the untouched French soil below. The LZ 93 was photographed during its fall to Earth and the pictures were published in the weekly Le Miroir on 4 November 1917. All crew on board the airship perished in the disaster, and the body of commander Stabbert can be seen next to his ship on the picture taken from the wreck. It is believed that the crew died when they were crushed by the zeppelin when it smashed into the ground, suggesting that the crew was fully aware of their 6 km long descent. The crew were all buried in the city of Gerbéviller. Four other zeppelins who had accompanied LZ 93 on its raid were also shot down above France.
