= SMS Blücher =

Armored cruiser of the German Imperial Navy

Coordinates: 54°33′30″N 05°27′50″E

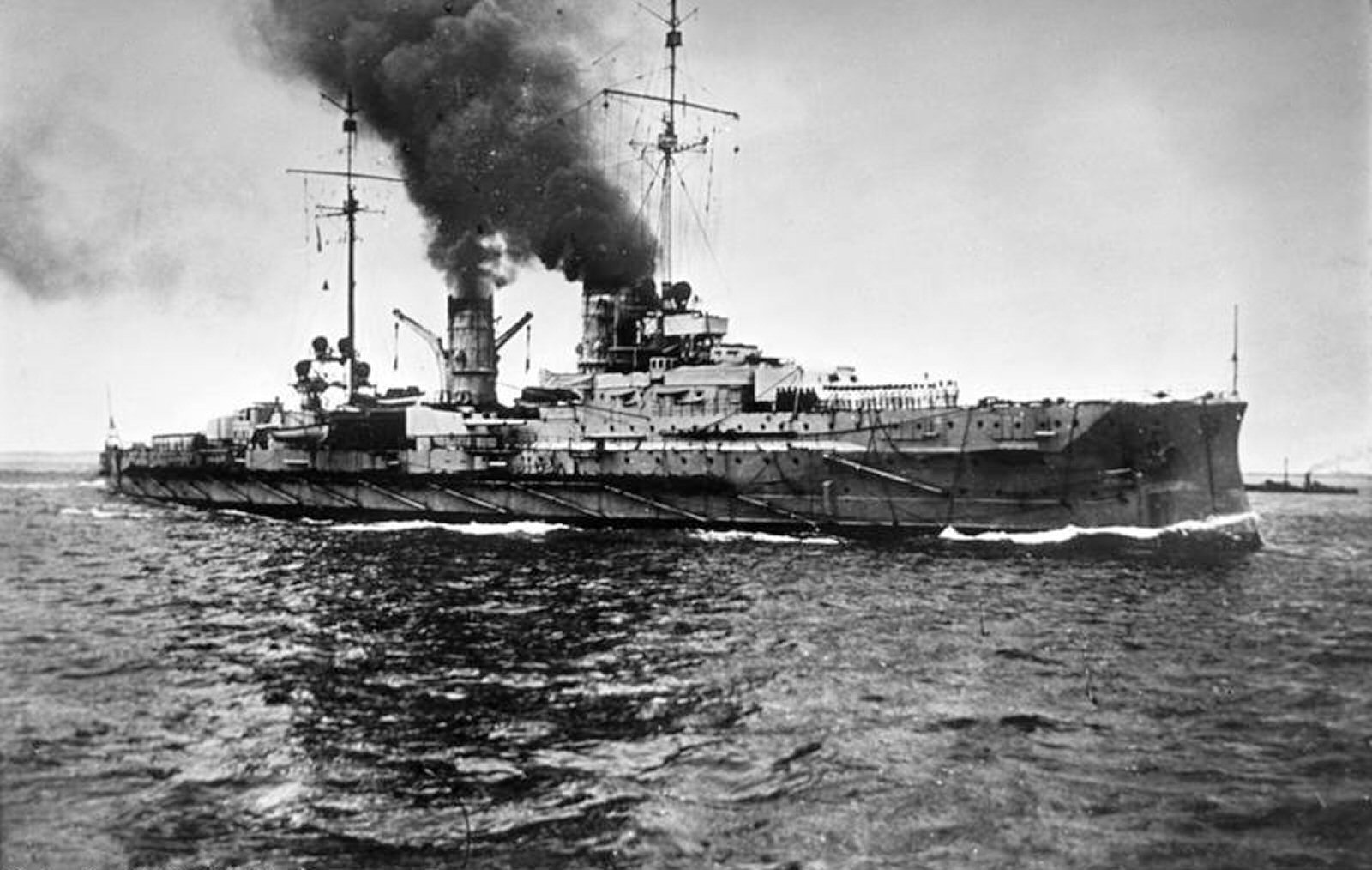
- SMS Blücher in 1912

Class overview
- Preceded by: Scharnhorst class
- Succeeded by: None

History

German Empire
- Name: Blücher
- Namesake: SMS Blücher (1877)
- Builder: Kaiserliche Werft, Kiel
- Laid down: 21 February 1907
- Launched: 11 April 1908
- Commissioned: 1 October 1909
- Fate: Sunk during the Battle of Dogger Bank, 24 January 1915

General characteristics
- Class & type: Armored cruiser
- Displacement: Normal: 15,842 t (15,592 long tons); Full load: 17,500 t (17,200 long tons)
- Length: 161.8 m (530 ft 10 in) overall
- Beam: 24.5 m (80 ft 5 in)
- Draft: 8.84 m (29 ft)
- Installed power: 18 × water-tube boilers; 38,323 PS (37,799 ihp)
- Propulsion: 3 × triple-expansion steam engines; 3 × screw propellers
- Speed: 25.4 knots (47.0 km/h; 29.2 mph)
- Range: 6,600 nmi (12,200 km; 7,600 mi) at 12 knots (22 km/h; 14 mph); 3,350 nmi (6,200 km; 3,860 mi) at 18 knots (33 km/h; 21 mph)
- Complement: 41 officers; 812 sailors
- Armament: 12 × 21 cm (8.3 in) SK L/45 guns; 8 × 15 cm (5.9 in) SK L/45 guns; 16 × 8.8 cm (3.5 in) SK L/45 guns; 4 × 45 cm (17.7 in) torpedo tubes
- Armor: Belt armor: 6–18 cm (2.4–7.1 in); Casemates: 14 cm (5.5 in); Barbettes: 18 cm (7 in); Turrets: 6–18 cm (2.4–7.1 in); Conning tower: 8–25 cm (3.1–9.8 in)

SMS Blücher (Note: "SMS" stands for "Seiner Majestät Schiff" (English: His Majesty's Ship).) was the last armored cruiser built for the German Kaiserliche Marine (Imperial Navy) beginning in 1907. She was designed in response to the latest British armored cruisers, but the British had already begun work on the Invincible-class battlecruisers, which marked a significant increase in firepower over earlier armored cruisers. Blücher was armed with a main battery of twelve 21 cm (8.3 in) guns, compared to the eight 30.5 cm (12 in) guns of the British ships. Blücher entered service after the Invincibles were commissioned, and as a result, was obsolescent at the start of her career.

Blücher was built at the Kaiserliche Werft shipyard in Kiel between 1907 and 1909, and commissioned on 1 October 1909. The ship initially served in the I Scouting Group for most of her career after entering service in 1910, but in late 1911 was transferred to serve as a gunnery training ship, where she remained until the outbreak of World War I in August 1914. She then returned to I Scouting Group, operating primarily in the North Sea against British forces. She took part in the operation to bombard Yarmouth and the raid on Scarborough, Hartlepool and Whitby in November and December 1914, respectively.

At the Battle of Dogger Bank on 24 January 1915, Blücher was slowed significantly after being hit by gunfire from the British battlecruiser squadron under the command of Vice Admiral David Beatty. Rear Admiral Franz von Hipper, the commander of the German squadron, decided to abandon Blücher to the pursuing enemy ships in order to save his more valuable battlecruisers. Under heavy fire from the British ships, she was sunk, and British destroyers began recovering the survivors. However, the destroyers withdrew when a German zeppelin began bombing them, mistaking the sinking Blücher for a British battlecruiser. The number of casualties is unknown, with figures ranging from 747 to around 1,000. Blücher was the only warship lost during the engagement.

== Background ==
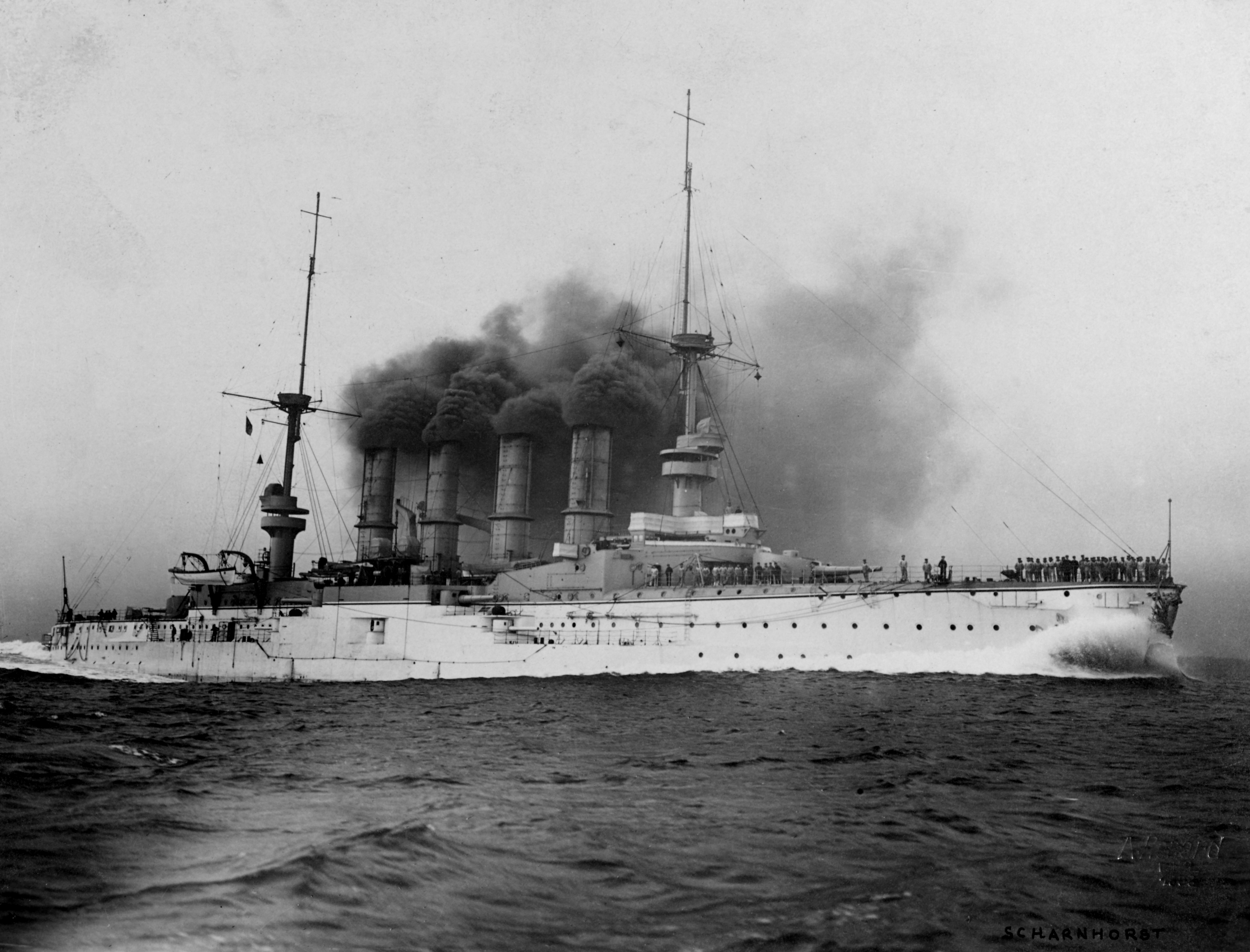
SMS Scharnhorst, a predecessor to Blücher

The Second Naval Law in Germany, passed in 1900, planned for a total of fourteen armored cruisers (Note: Armored cruisers were vessels that generally possessed side armor intended to serve on foreign stations, as a fast wing of a fleet of battleships, or to attack or protect merchant shipping. Side armor differentiated them from large protected cruisers that only incorporated an armor deck for defense against enemy fire.)—referred to as Grosse Kreuzer (large cruisers). These vessels were designed for several tasks: to engage the reconnaissance forces of rival navies, as well as fight in the line of battle. They were also needed to serve in the German colonial empire to protect economic interests abroad. The German armored cruiser program had begun in the late 1890s with Fürst Bismarck, and included a number of iterative designs including Prinz Heinrich and the Prinz Adalbert, Roon, and Scharnhorst classes. Each new design incorporated incremental improvements over the last, such as increased speed, additional or more powerful guns, and more effective armor plating. In general, the German armored cruisers received less armor protection than their opposite numbers in the British fleet. As a result, they compared unfavorably with their British contemporaries.

Throughout the 1890s and early 1900s, development of the armored cruiser in foreign navies followed a similar pattern. And each development spurred further competition from rival powers, such as that between Argentina and Chile between 1895 and 1902, and perennial competition between the major European navies. Beginning in the early 1900s, Admiral Jackie Fisher, then the First Sea Lord of the British Royal Navy, concluded that future construction should not include battleships or armored cruiser, but a new capital ship that combined the best properties of both types. This new vessel, which would come to be known as the battlecruiser, would carry the same large-caliber armament of the battleship but would have the same high speed of the armored cruiser.

German naval construction in the period was governed by the Naval Law, which had been originally passed in 1898 and amended once in 1900. Under its terms, vessels as old as the converted ironclads König Wilhelm and the two Kaiser-class ships, which had been rebuilt into armored cruisers in the 1890s. According to the time-table laid out in the law, these old ships would not be due to be replaced until 1910. A second amendment, passed in 1906, provided for an increase to twenty large cruisers, which meant that construction would begin on the first vessel immediately.

== Design ==
Sketch of Blücher underway by Oscar Parkes

Development of the next German armored cruiser, which was to follow the Scharnhorst class, began in early 1905; at that time, the Germans were not aware of Fisher's thinking on future developments of the type. The latest class of British armored cruisers, the Minotaur class, were known to be armed with 9.2 in (23 cm) guns, and it was believed that later classes would carry six or eight of these guns. The German design staff produced a pair of designs in response, "A" and "B", which were in most respects improved Scharnhorst-class cruisers. "A" adopted the same armament of eight 21 cm (8.3 in) guns, while "B" opted for a main battery of twelve 21 cm guns in six twin gun turrets, four of which were wing turrets. Both variants had significantly improved armor protection compared to Scharnhorst, including a 20% increase to the belt thickness.

Because the new cruiser would be ordered under the provisional name "E", (Note: German warships were ordered under provisional names. For new additions to the fleet, they were given a single letter; for those ships intended to replace older or lost vessels, they were ordered as "Ersatz (name of the ship to be replaced)". See: Dodson 2016, pp. 8–9) both versions were renamed "E1" and "E2", respectively, as they were developed further. Additional boilers were added to increase speed, using as many as five funnels to vent the boilers. The cost of "E2" prompted a third variant, which eliminated the wing turrets in favor of casemate mountings for three guns per side (but leaving the fore and aft turrets). Another variant, "E5", carried a main armament of eight 21 cm guns, retaining the fore and aft turrets, with the remainder in single-gun wing turrets. In May, "E6" kept "E5"'s layout, but replaced the ten-gun 15 cm (5.9 in) secondary battery for eight 17 cm (6.7 in) guns. Two further versions, "E7" and "E8", were broadly similar, but "E7" was slightly smaller, and "E8" reverted to the 15 cm secondary battery.

Consideration was given to a larger 24 cm (9 in) SK L/45 gun for the main battery, but it was found to be too large and expensive, so all further work kept the 21 cm main armament. In September, "E9" was introduced, which was significantly larger than previous ships. It would have carried twelve 21 cm guns as in the "E2" design. "E10" and "E11" quickly followed the same month, the changes mostly related to the number of secondary guns and the spacing of the main battery turrets on the basis of experience gained during the Russo-Japanese War that had recently ended. At the end of the month, proposal "E15" had settled on the characteristics that would be incorporated into the ship that was built. Further experimentation was carried out between September 1905 and March 1906, which produced a series of designs from "E17" to "E23", but they were deemed to be too expensive. In the meantime, "E15" was refined further into the definitive proposal "E16B", which was half of a knot faster than "E15" and trunked the four funnels of the earlier design into two larger funnels.

The Reichstag authorized funds for the new ship, which was to be named Blücher after the earlier screw corvette of the same name, on 26 May 1906, along with the first two Nassau-class battleships, in accordance with the 1906 amendment to the Naval Law. Though the ship would be much larger and more powerful than previous armored cruisers, Blücher retained that designation in an attempt to conceal its more powerful nature. Kaiser Wilhelm II signed the construction order on 21 June, though work would not begin until early 1907. By that time, Fisher's battlecruisers, the first of which were the Invincible class, were nearing launching, and the details of their armament became known. It was too late to alter the design (in part because it would have entailed significant cost increases over the funds already authorized), and so construction proceeded as planned. Though the German ship's 21 cm armament was clearly outclassed by the eight 30.5 cm (12 in) guns of the Invincibles in terms of power, the guns had similar maximum effective ranges, and Blücher had better armor protection. According to the historian Aidan Dodson, Blücher was "...overall a far better balanced design" compared to Invincible.

=== General characteristics ===
Blücher was 161.1 m (528 ft 7 in) long at the waterline and 161.8 m (530 ft 10 in) long overall. The ship had a beam of 24.5 m (80 ft 5 in), and with the anti-torpedo nets mounted along the sides of the ship, the beam increased to 25.62 m (84 ft 1 in). Blücher had a draft of 8.84 m (29 ft) forward, but slightly less aft, at 8.56 m (28 ft 1 in). The ship displaced 15,842 t (15,592 long tons) at her designed weight, and up to 17,500 t (17,200 long tons) at full load. Her hull was constructed with both transverse and longitudinal steel frames and she had thirteen watertight compartments and a double bottom that ran for approximately 65 percent of the length of the hull. The ship had a raised forecastle deck that extended for the first third of the length of the hull, where it stepped down to main deck level. Her superstructure consisted of a large conning tower forward with a bridge atop, and a smaller conning position further aft. She was fitted with a pair of light pole masts for signaling and observation purposes.

Documents from the German naval archives generally indicate satisfaction with Blücher's minor pitch and gentle motion at sea. However, she suffered from severe roll, and with the rudder hard over, she heeled over up to 10 degrees from the vertical and lost up to 55 percent of her speed. Blücher's metacentric height was 1.63 m (5 ft 4 in). The ship had a standard crew of 41 officers and 812 enlisted men, with an additional 14 officers and 62 sailors when she served as a squadron flagship. She carried a number of smaller vessels, including two picket boats, three barges, two launches, two yawls, and one dinghy.

=== Propulsion ===
Blücher was equipped with three vertical, 4-cylinder triple-expansion steam engines. Each engine drove a screw propeller, the center screw being 5.3 m (17 ft 5 in) in diameter, while the outer two screws were slightly larger, at 5.6 m (18 ft 4 in) in diameter. The ship had a single rudder with which to steer. The three engines were segregated in individual engine rooms. Steam was provided by eighteen coal-fired, marine-type water-tube boilers, which were also divided into five boiler rooms. The boilers were vented through a pair of large funnels, one directly aft of the foremast and the other directly amidships. Electrical power for the ship was supplied by six turbo-generators that provided up to 1,000 kilowatts, rated at 225 volts.

The ship had a designed maximum speed of 24.5 knots (45.4 km/h; 28.2 mph) from 32,000 metric horsepower (32,000 ihp). During her initial speed trials, she achieved 25.4 knots (47.0 km/h; 29.2 mph) from 38,323 PS (37,799 ihp); this was the highest power ever achieved by a reciprocating engine warship. The ship was designed to carry 900 t (890 long tons) of coal, though voids in the hull could be used to expand the fuel supply to up to 2,510 t (2,470 long tons) of coal. This provided a cruising radius of 6,600 nautical miles (12,200 km; 7,600 mi) at a cruising speed of 12 knots (22 km/h; 14 mph). When she increased speed to 18 knots (33 km/h; 21 mph), her range fell to 3,250 nmi (6,020 km; 3,740 mi).

=== Armament ===
Line-drawing of Blücher, showing the disposition of the main battery and armor protection

Blücher was equipped with twelve 21 cm (8.3 in) SK L/45 (Note: In Imperial German Navy gun nomenclature, "SK" (Schnelladekanone) denotes that the gun is quick firing, while the L/45 denotes the length of the gun. In this case, the L/45 gun is 45 caliber, meaning that the gun's barrel is 45 times as long as the diameter of its bore. See: Grießmer, p. 177.) quick-firing guns in six twin turrets, one pair fore and one pair aft, and two pairs in wing turrets on either side of the superstructure. The guns were supplied with a total of 1,020 shells, or 85 rounds per gun. Each shell weighed 108 kg (238 lb), and was fired using a 35.1 kg (77.3 lb) propellant charge that provided a muzzle velocity of 900 m/s (3,000 ft/s). The propellant was stored in brass cartridges, unlike the silk bags used in many other navies, so the turrets were more resistant to ammunition fires. The guns could be depressed to −5° and elevated to 30°, providing a maximum range of 19,100 m (20,900 yd). Their rate of fire was 6 rounds per minute per gun.

The ship had a secondary battery of eight 15 cm (5.9 in) quick-firing guns mounted in casemates, four centered amidships on either side of the vessel. These guns could engage targets out to 13,500 m (14,800 yd). They were supplied with 1320 rounds, for 165 shells per gun. The shells were 45.3 kg (99.9 lb), and were loaded with a 13.7 kg (30.2 lb) RPC/12 propellant charge in a brass cartridge. The guns fired at a muzzle velocity of 835 m (2,740 ft) per second, at a rate of seven rounds per minute.

Blücher was also armed with sixteen 8.8 cm (3.5 in) SK L/45 quick-firing guns, placed in both casemates and pivot mounts. Four of these guns were mounted in casemates near the bridge, four in casemates in the bow, another four in casemates at the stern, and the remaining four were mounted in pivot mounts in the rear superstructure. They were supplied with a total of 3,200 rounds, or 200 shells per gun, and could fire at a rate of 15 shells per minute. Their high explosive shells weighed 10 kg (22 lb), and were loaded with a 2.33 kg (5.13 lb) propellant charge. The guns had a maximum range of 10,700 m (11,700 yd).

Blücher was also equipped with four 45 cm (17.7 in) torpedo tubes. One was placed in the bow, one in the stern, and the other two were placed on the broadside, all below the waterline. The ship carried a total of 11 torpedoes. The torpedoes carried a 110 kg (240 lb) warhead and had two speed settings, which affected the range. At 32 knots (59 km/h; 37 mph), the weapon had a range of 2,000 m (2,200 yd) and at 36 knots (67 km/h; 41 mph), the range was reduced to 1,500 m (1,600 yd).

=== Armor ===
As with other German capital ships of the period, Blücher was equipped with Krupp cemented armor. The armored deck was between 5–7 cm (2.0–2.8 in) in thickness; more important areas of the ship were protected with thicker armor, while less critical portions of the deck used the thinner armor. The armored belt was 18 cm (7.1 in) thick in the central portion of the ship where propulsion machinery, ammunition magazines, and other vitals were located, and tapered to 8 cm (3.1 in) in less important areas of the hull. The belt tapered down to zero at either end of the ship. Behind the entire length of the belt armor was an additional 3 cm (1.2 in) of teak. The armored belt was supplemented by a 3.5 cm (1.4 in) torpedo bulkhead, though this only ran between the forward and rear centerline gun turrets.

The forward conning tower was the most heavily armored part of the ship. Its sides were 25 cm (9.8 in) thick and it had a roof that was 8 cm thick. The rear conning tower was significantly less well armored, with a roof that was 3 cm thick and sides that were only 14 cm (5.5 in) thick. The central citadel of the ship was protected by 16 cm (6.3 in) armor. The main battery turrets were 8 cm thick in their roofs, and had 18 cm sides. The 15 cm turret casemates were protected by 14 cm of armor.

== Service history ==
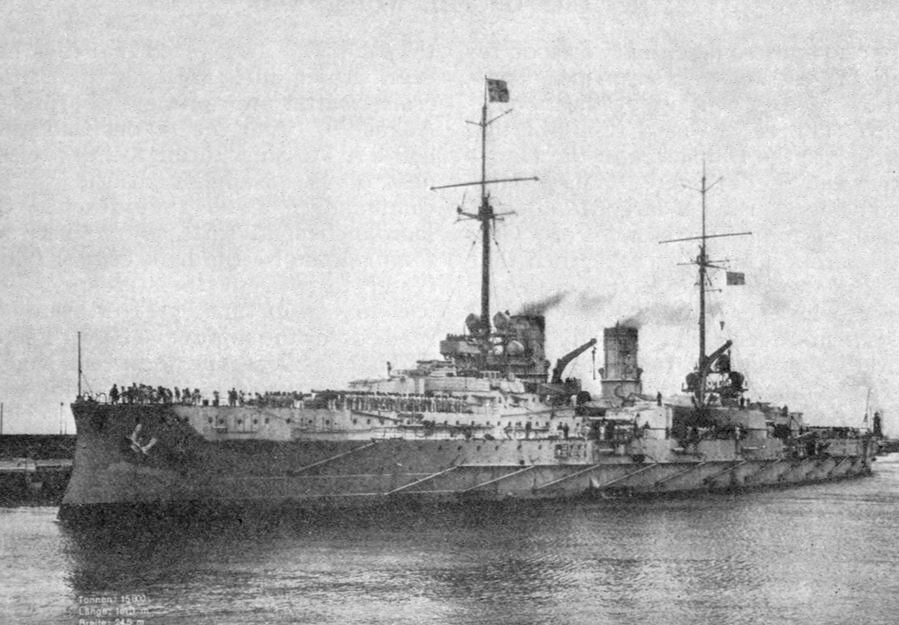
SMS Blücher pre-war, circa 1913

Blücher was launched on 11 April 1908, and General Colmar Freiherr von der Goltz gave a speech at the ceremony; the great-granddaughter of Gebhard Leberecht von Blücher, the namesake of the original corvette Blücher, christened the vessel. The new cruiser was commissioned into the fleet on 1 October 1909, under the command of Kapitän zur See (KzS—Captain at Sea) Curt von Rössing. Lengthy sea trials followed, and the ship was not ready for active service until 27 April 1910. Though the German fleet was short of modern armored cruisers—the Prinz Heinrich and Prinz Adalbert classes were obsolescent, and the Scharnhorsts had been sent to the East Asia Squadron—Blücher was intended to serve as a training ship for naval gunners. But because the German battlecruisers, beginning with Von der Tann, had not yet entered service, Blücher was sent to serve briefly with I Scouting Group of the High Seas Fleet. She became the group flagship, serving under Vizeadmiral (Vice Admiral) August von Heeringen. The unit at that time included the armored cruiser Gneisenau, the two Roon-class cruisers, and six light cruisers. Blücher and the other ships participated in training exercises with the fleet over the summer months and then cruised in Norwegian waters. In October, KzS Georg Scheidt relieved Rössing as the ship's captain.

For most of 1911, Blücher remained with I Scouting Group, and she won the Kaiser's Schiesspreis (Shooting Prize) for excellent gunnery among the fleet's large cruisers. That year, KzS Heinrich Trendtel temporarily commanded the ship from April to late September. On 28 September, Heeringen transferred his flag to Von der Tann, which had recently entered service. Blücher was accordingly transferred to the Inspektion der Schiffsartillerie (Naval Artillery Inspectorate), and she came under the command of KzS Waldemar Pieper. In November, she briefly returned to operate with the High Seas Fleet during its winter cruise. The ship thereafter sailed to Kiel for an annual overhaul that included modifications to make the ship more suitable for gunnery training.

Blücher sailed from German waters in company with the pre-dreadnought battleship Elsass in early April 1912 to conduct long-range shooting trials in the Faroe Islands. The experiments were carried out from 10 to 21 April with the permission of the Danish government. The two ships returned to Kiel on 24 April. Blücher thereafter operated with the fleet during training exercises that lasted from 6 May to 2 June. On 2 September, she joined II Scouting Group for the annual autumn maneuvers. She served as the group flagship, which also included the armored cruiser Friedrich Carl, four light cruisers, and the new battlecruiser Goeben, which was then still on her sea trials. The exercises concluded on 22 September, after which Blücher returned to training duties.

In early March 1913, Blücher cruised in the North Sea to conduct shooting practice at sea, as opposed to the sheltered waters of the western Baltic, where she typically operated. During this period, she used Cuxhaven and Helgoland as bases. She returned to fleet service on 13 May for a short training period that concluded at the end of the month. On 29 May, while on the way back to the Baltic, she ran aground off the island of Romsø in the Great Belt. The other vessels of the Naval Artillery Inspectorate were sent to assist Blücher, and on 1 June, the light cruiser Augsburg was able to pull her free. It was initially unclear if the ship's engines and propellers were operable, so Augsburg, the light cruiser Stuttgart, and the pre-dreadnought Wettin took Blücher under tow. She eventually got underway under her own power, however, and proceeded to Kiel for repairs. A court-martial sentenced Pieper to three days' confinement to his quarters for "negligence in the performance of his duties, and the navigator received six days of confinement, but neither man received more serious charges. Blücher saw no further peacetime operations with the High Seas Fleet. In October, Fregattenkapitän (Frigate Captain) Alexander Erdmann took command of the ship; he was to be the vessel's final captain.

=== World War I ===
The ship was anchored off Sonderburg on 28 June 1914 for celebrations of the 50th anniversary of the victories of the Second Schleswig War. That day, Archduke Franz Ferdinand of Austria-Hungary was assassinated in Sarajevo, Bosnia. The murder of Ferdinand and his wife sparked a dramatic increase in tensions between the major European powers that culminated in the July Crisis, and ultimately, the outbreak of World War I on 28 July. Initially, however, the German naval command viewed war as unlikely, and Blücher was sent into dry dock in Kiel for periodic maintenance. Work on the ship was soon accelerated, particularly after Germany declared war on France on 3 August, and she was back in service on 5 August. Grossadmiral (Grand Admiral) Prince Heinrich of Prussia, the commander of naval forces in the Baltic Sea, requested Blücher be assigned to his command to lead his reconnaissance forces, but the Admiralstab (Admiralty Staff) rejected the request and instead assigned the ship to I Scouting Group. She joined the unit on 8 August, and at that time, the unit was commanded by Konteradmiral (KAdm—Rear Admiral) Franz Hipper. I Scouting Group included the battlecruisers Von der Tann, Moltke, and the flagship Seydlitz.

Nevertheless, Blücher's first wartime operation took place in the Baltic, when in early September she was temporarily transferred to Heinrich's command. On 3 September, Blücher, along with seven pre-dreadnought battleships of the IV Squadron, five cruisers, and 24 destroyers sailed into the Baltic in an attempt to draw out a portion of the Russian fleet and destroy it. The light cruiser Augsburg encountered the armored cruisers Bayan and Pallada north of Dagö (now Hiiumaa) island. The German cruiser attempted to lure the Russian ships back towards Blücher so that she could destroy them, but the Russians refused to take the bait and instead withdrew to the Gulf of Finland. On 9 September, the operation was terminated without any major engagements between the two fleets. Blücher thereafter returned to the North Sea and rejoined I Scouting Group.

On 2 November 1914, Blücher—along with the battlecruisers Moltke, Von der Tann, and Seydlitz, and accompanied by four light cruisers, left the Jade Bight and steamed towards the English coast. The flotilla arrived off Great Yarmouth at daybreak the following morning and bombarded the port, while the light cruiser Stralsund laid a minefield. The British submarine HMS D5 responded to the bombardment, but struck one of the mines laid by Stralsund and sank. Shortly thereafter, Hipper ordered his ships to turn back to German waters. On the way, a heavy fog covered the Heligoland Bight, so the ships were ordered to halt until visibility improved and they could safely navigate the defensive minefields. The armored cruiser Yorck made a navigational error that led her into one of the German minefields. She struck two mines and quickly sank; only 127 men out of the crew of 629 were rescued.

==== Bombardment of Scarborough, Hartlepool, and Whitby ====
Blücher during World War I

Admiral Friedrich von Ingenohl, commander of the High Seas Fleet, decided that another raid on the English coast should be carried out in the hopes of luring a portion of the Grand Fleet into combat where it could be destroyed. At 03:20, CET on 15 December 1914, Blücher, Moltke, Von der Tann, the new battlecruiser Derfflinger, and Seydlitz, along with the light cruisers Kolberg, Strassburg, Stralsund, Graudenz, and two squadrons of torpedo boats left the Jade estuary. The ships sailed north past the island of Heligoland, until they reached the Horns Reef lighthouse, at which point the ships turned west towards Scarborough. Twelve hours after Hipper left the Jade, the High Seas Fleet, consisting of 14 dreadnoughts and eight pre-dreadnoughts and a screening force of two armored cruisers, seven light cruisers, and 54 torpedo boats, departed to provide distant cover for the bombardment force.

On 26 August 1914, the German light cruiser Magdeburg had run aground in the Gulf of Finland; the wreck was captured by the Russian navy, which found code books used by the German navy, along with navigational charts for the North Sea. These documents were then passed on to the Royal Navy. Room 40 began decrypting German signals, and on 14 December, intercepted messages relating to the plan to bombard Scarborough. The exact details of the plan were unknown, and it was assumed that the High Seas Fleet would remain safely in port, as in the previous bombardment. Vice Admiral David Beatty's four battlecruisers, supported by the 3rd Cruiser Squadron and the 1st Light Cruiser Squadron, along with the 2nd Battle Squadron's six dreadnoughts, were to ambush Hipper's battlecruisers.

On the night of 15/16 December, the main body of the High Seas Fleet encountered British destroyers. Fearing the prospect of a nighttime torpedo attack, Ingenohl ordered the ships to retreat. Hipper was unaware of Ingenohl's reversal, and so he continued with the bombardment. Upon reaching the British coast, Hipper's battlecruisers split into two groups. Seydlitz, Moltke, and Blücher went north to shell Hartlepool, while Von der Tann and Derfflinger went south to shell Scarborough and Whitby. Of the three towns, only Hartlepool was defended by coastal artillery batteries. During the bombardment of Hartlepool, Seydlitz was hit three times and Blücher was hit six times by the coastal battery. Blücher suffered minimal damage, but nine men were killed and another three were wounded. By 09:45 on the 16th, the two groups had reassembled, and they began to retreat eastward.

The High Seas Fleet's disposition on the morning of 16 December

By this time, Beatty's battlecruisers were in position to block Hipper's chosen egress route, while other forces were en route to complete the encirclement. At 12:25, the light cruisers of the II Scouting Group began to pass through the British forces searching for Hipper. One of the cruisers in the 2nd Light Cruiser Squadron spotted Stralsund and signaled a report to Beatty. At 12:30, Beatty turned his battlecruisers towards the German ships. Beatty presumed that the German cruisers were the advance screen for Hipper's ships, but the battlecruisers were some 50 km (27 nmi; 31 mi) ahead. The 2nd Light Cruiser Squadron, which had been screening for Beatty's ships, detached to pursue the German cruisers, but a misinterpreted signal from the British battlecruisers sent them back to their screening positions. (Note: Beatty had intended to retain only the two rearmost light cruisers from Goodenough's squadron, but HMS Nottingham's signalman misinterpreted the signal, thinking that it was intended for the whole squadron, and thus transmitted it to Goodenough, who ordered his ships back into their screening positions ahead of Beatty's battlecruisers.) This confusion allowed the German light cruisers to escape and alerted Hipper to the location of the British battlecruisers. The German battlecruisers wheeled to the northeast of the British forces and made good their escape.

Both the British and the Germans were disappointed that they failed to effectively engage their opponents. Ingenohl's reputation suffered greatly as a result of his timidity. The captain of Moltke was furious; he stated that Ingenohl had turned back "because he was afraid of eleven British destroyers which could have been eliminated ... Under the present leadership we will accomplish nothing." The official German history criticized Ingenohl for failing to use his light forces to determine the size of the British fleet, stating: "He decided on a measure which not only seriously jeopardized his advance forces off the English coast but also deprived the German Fleet of a signal and certain victory."

==== Battle of Dogger Bank ====
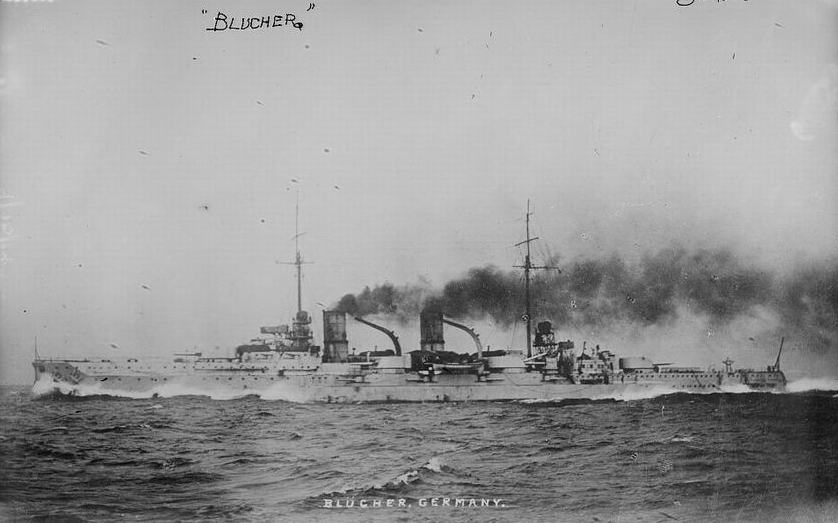
Blücher underway

In early January 1915 the German naval command found out that British ships were conducting reconnaissance in the Dogger Bank area. Admiral Ingenohl was initially reluctant to attempt to destroy these forces, because the I Scouting Group was temporarily weakened while Von der Tann was in drydock for periodic maintenance. KAdm Richard Eckermann—the Chief of Staff of the High Seas Fleet—insisted on the operation, and so Ingenohl relented and ordered Hipper to take his battlecruisers to the Dogger Bank.

On 23 January, Hipper sortied, with Seydlitz in the lead, followed by Moltke, Derfflinger, and Blücher, along with the light cruisers Graudenz, Rostock, Stralsund, and Kolberg and 19 torpedo boats from V Flotilla and II and XVIII Half-Flotillas. Graudenz and Stralsund were assigned to the forward screen, while Kolberg and Rostock were assigned to the starboard and port, respectively. Each light cruiser had a half-flotilla of torpedo boats attached.

Again, interception and decryption of German wireless signals played an important role. Although they were unaware of the exact plans, the cryptographers of Room 40 were able to deduce that Hipper would be conducting an operation in the Dogger Bank area. To counter it, Beatty's 1st Battlecruiser Squadron, Rear Admiral Gordon Moore's 2nd Battlecruiser Squadron and Commodore William Goodenough's 2nd Light Cruiser Squadron were to rendezvous with Commodore Reginald Tyrwhitt's Harwich Force at 08:00 on 24 January, approximately 30 nmi (56 km; 35 mi) north of the Dogger Bank.

At 08:14, Kolberg spotted the light cruiser Aurora and several destroyers from the Harwich Force. Aurora challenged Kolberg with a searchlight, at which point Kolberg attacked Aurora and scored two hits. Aurora returned fire and scored two hits on Kolberg in retaliation. Hipper immediately turned his battlecruisers towards the gunfire, when, almost simultaneously, Stralsund spotted a large amount of smoke to the northwest of her position. This was identified as a number of large British warships steaming toward Hipper's ships. Hipper later remarked:

The presence of such a large force indicated the proximity of further sections of the British Fleet, especially as wireless intercepts revealed the approach of 2nd Battlecruiser Squadron ... They were also reported by Blücher at the rear of the German line, which had opened fire on a light cruiser and several destroyers coming up from astern ... The battlecruisers under my command found themselves, in view of the prevailing [East-North-East] wind, in the windward position and so in an unfavourable situation from the outset ...

Hipper turned south to flee, but was limited to 23 kn (43 km/h; 26 mph), which was Blücher's maximum speed at the time. (Note: Throughout the war, the German Navy suffered from a chronic shortage of high-quality coal. Consequently, its ships' engines could not operate at maximum performance. For example, at the Battle of Jutland, the battlecruiser Von der Tann, which had a maximum speed of 27.5 kn (50.9 km/h; 31.6 mph), was limited to 18 kn (33 km/h; 21 mph) for a significant length of time as a result of this problem. See: Philbin, pp. 56–57.) The pursuing British battlecruisers were steaming at 27 kn (50 km/h; 31 mph), and quickly caught up to the German ships. At 09:52, Lion opened fire on Blücher from a range of approximately 20,000 yards (18,000 m); shortly after, Princess Royal and Tiger began firing as well. At 10:09, the British guns made their first hit on Blücher. Two minutes later, the German ships began returning fire, primarily concentrating on Lion, from a range of 18,000 yd (16,000 m). At 10:28, Lion was struck on the waterline, which tore a hole in the side of the ship and flooded a coal bunker. At around this time, Blücher scored a hit with a 21 cm shell on Lion's forward turret. The shell failed to penetrate the armor, but had concussion effect and temporarily disabled the left gun. At 10:30, New Zealand—the fourth ship in Beatty's line—came within range of Blücher and opened fire. By 10:35, the range had closed to 17,500 yd (16,000 m), at which point the entire German line was within the effective range of the British ships. Beatty ordered his battlecruisers to engage their German counterparts. (Note: Thus, Lion on Seydlitz, Tiger on Moltke, Princess Royal on Derfflinger, and New Zealand on Blücher.)

By 11:00, Blücher had been severely damaged after being pounded by numerous heavy shells from the British battlecruisers. However, the three leading German battlecruisers, Seydlitz, Derfflinger, and Moltke, had concentrated their fire on Lion and scored several hits; two of her three dynamos were disabled and the port side engine room had been flooded. At 11:48, Indomitable arrived on the scene, and was directed by Beatty to destroy the battered Blücher, which was already on fire and listing heavily to port. One of the ship's survivors recounted the destruction that was being wrought:

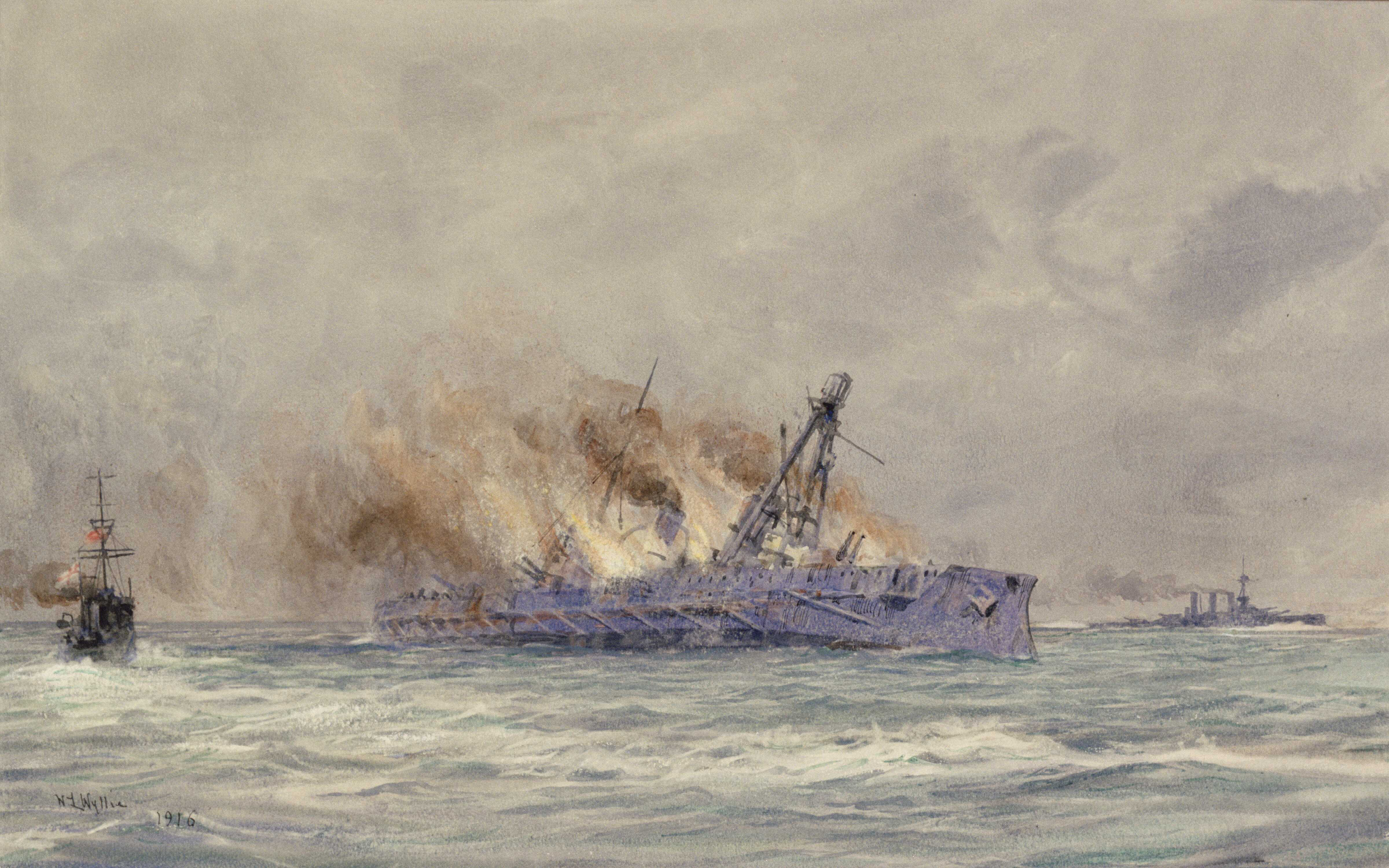
A painting of Blücher afire and listing badly

The shells ... bore their way even to the stokehold. The coal in the bunkers was set on fire. Since the bunkers were half empty, the fire burned merrily. In the engine room a shell licked up the oil and sprayed it around in flames of blue and green ... The terrific air pressure resulting from [an] explosion in a confined space ... roar[ed] through every opening and [tore] its way through every weak spot ... Men were picked up by that terrific air pressure and tossed to a horrible death among the machinery.

The British attack was interrupted due to reports of U-boats ahead of the British ships. Beatty quickly ordered evasive maneuvers, which allowed the German ships to increase the distance from their pursuers. At this time, Lion's last operational dynamo failed, which reduced her speed to 15 kn (28 km/h; 17 mph). Beatty, in the stricken Lion, ordered the remaining battlecruisers to "Engage the enemy's rear", but signal confusion caused the ships to target Blücher alone. She continued to resist stubbornly; Blücher repulsed attacks by the four cruisers of the 1st Light Cruiser Squadron and four destroyers. However, the 1st Light Cruiser Squadron flagship, Aurora, hit Blücher twice with torpedoes. By this time, every main battery gun turret except the rear mount had been silenced. A volley of seven more torpedoes was launched at point-blank range; these hits caused the ship to capsize at 13:13. Blücher remained afloat, upside down, for several minutes before sinking. In the course of the engagement, Blücher had been hit by 70–100 large-caliber shells and several torpedoes.

As the ship was sinking, British destroyers steamed towards her in an attempt to rescue survivors from the water. However, the German zeppelin L5 mistook the sinking Blücher for a British battlecruiser, and tried to bomb the destroyers, which withdrew. Figures vary on the number of casualties; Paul Schmalenbach reported 6 officers of a total of 29 and 275 enlisted men of a complement of 999 were pulled from the water, for a total of 747 men killed. The official German sources examined by Erich Gröner stated that 792 men died when Blücher sank, while James Goldrick referred to British documents, which reported only 234 men survived from a crew of at least 1,200. The historians Hans Hildebrand, Albert Röhr, and Hans-Otto Steinmetz concur with Gröner's total of 792 deaths, but state that there were 260 survivors. Erdmann was among those who had been rescued, though he later died of pneumonia while in British captivity. A further twenty men would also die as prisoners of war.

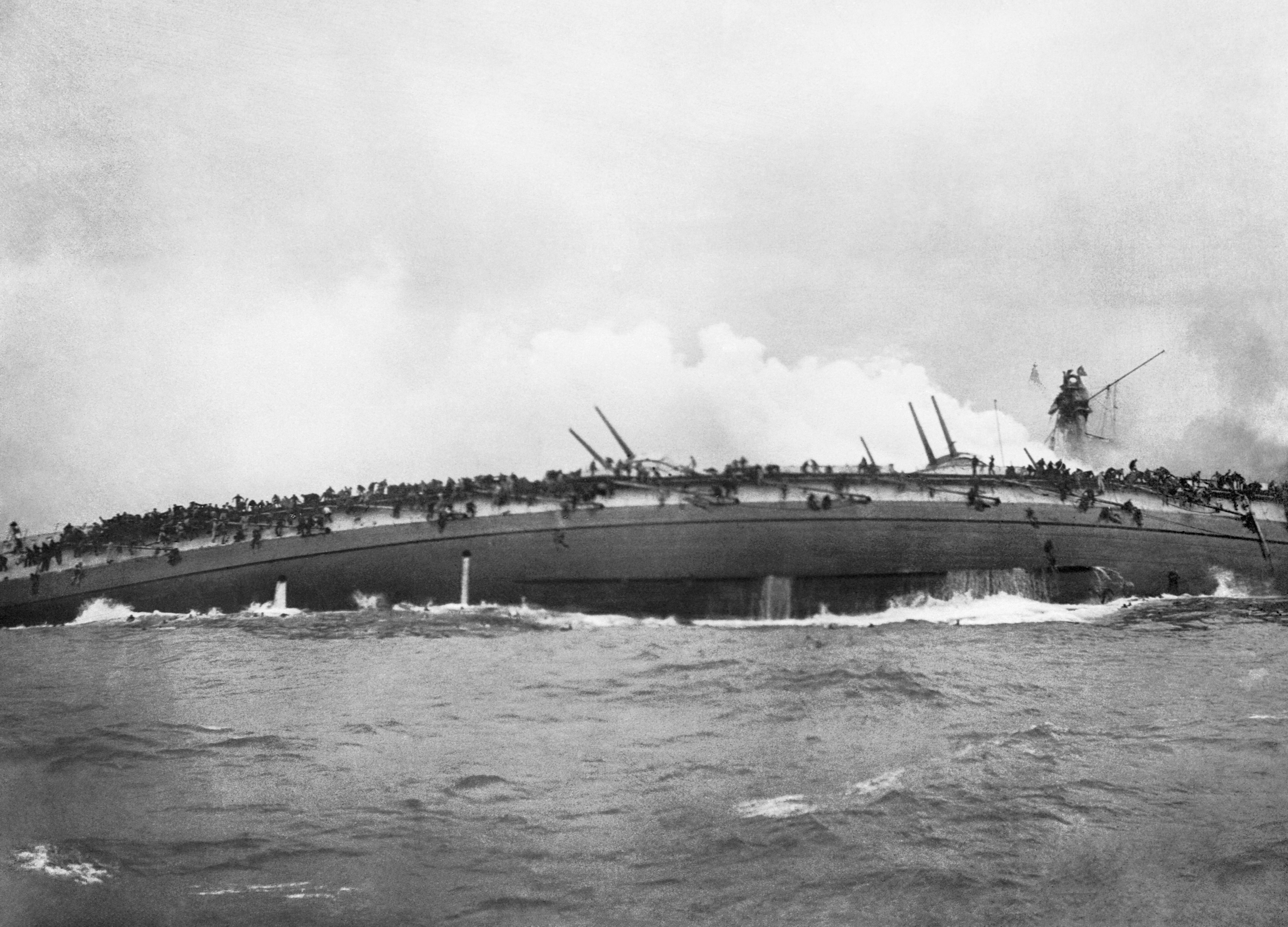
The sinking Blücher rolls over on her side

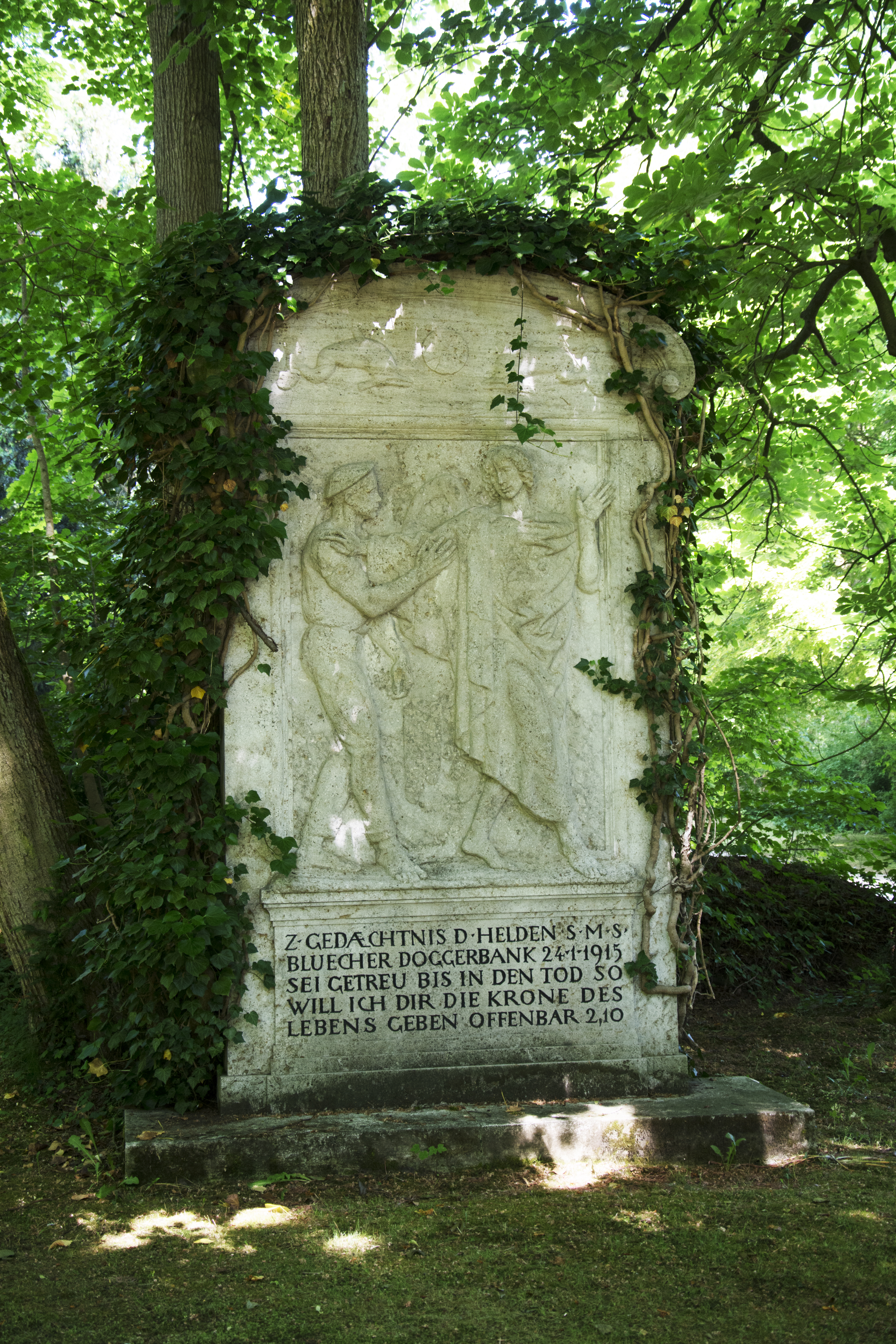
Remembrance stele SMS Blücher, Nordfriedhof, Kiel, Germany

The concentration on Blücher allowed Moltke, Seydlitz, and Derfflinger to escape. Hipper had originally intended to use his three battlecruisers to turn about and flank the British ships, in order to relieve the battered Blücher, but when he learned of the severe damage to his flagship, he decided to abandon the armored cruiser. Hipper later recounted his decision:

In order to help the Blücher it was decided to try for a flanking move ... But as I was informed that in my flagship turrets C and D were out of action, we were full of water aft, and that she had only 200 rounds of heavy shell left, I dismissed any further thought of supporting the Blücher. Any such course, now that no intervention from our Main Fleet was to be counted on, was likely to lead to further heavy losses. The support of the Blücher by the flanking move would have brought my formation between the British battlecruisers and the battle squadrons which were probably behind.

By the time Beatty regained control over his ships, having boarded Princess Royal, the German ships had too great a lead for the British to catch them; at 13:50, he broke off the chase. Kaiser Wilhelm II was enraged by the destruction of Blücher and the near sinking of Seydlitz, and ordered the High Seas Fleet to remain in harbor. Eckermann was removed from his post and Ingenohl was forced to resign. He was replaced by Admiral Hugo von Pohl. Beyond the loss of the ship itself and the resulting command changes, the death of so many men negatively impacted the fleet, as Blücher was crewed by a large number of highly trained artillery specialists.

== Wreck ==
Blücher's wreck was located in 2026, resting at a depth of 40 m (130 ft).
