= Zeppelin LZ 32 =

LZ 32
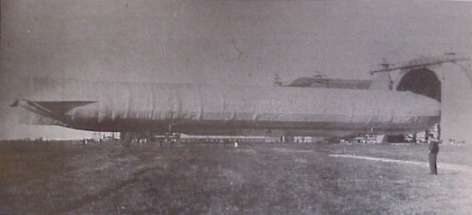

General information
- Type: M2-class Zeppelin - reconnaissance bomber rigid airship
- National origin: Imperial Germany
- Manufacturer: Luftschiffbau Zeppelin at Friedrichshafen
- Designer: Ludwig Dürr
- Status: destroyed / scrapped
- Primary user: Imperial German Navy
- Number built: 1

History
- First flight: 20 November 1914
- Retired: 4 May 1916

M2-class zeppelin LZ 32, given tactical number L 7, was a rigid airship operated by the Kaiserliche Marine, which flew 164 times, including 77 reconnaissance missions over the North Sea, with several unsuccessful attempts to attack English coastal towns. Brought down on 4 May 1916 by anti-aircraft fire from HMS Phaeton and HMS Galatea, she was destroyed by Royal Navy submarine HMS E31 off Horns Reef.

== Loss ==
While on a mission, LZ 32 was spotted by light cruisers HMS Galatea and HMS Phaeton who opened fire on the airship. Just as they were doing this HMS E31 was operating with the sea plane carrier Engadine in the North Sea in an air raid on the Zeppelin sheds at Tondern on 4 May 1916. E31 surfaced and spotted the airship, but being vulnerable on the surface, the sub dived to avoid attack. When the submarine put its periscope up, it observed that the Zeppelin was losing altitude after being hit by shells from Galatea and Phaeton. E31 then surfaced just in time to get in the fatal shot and brought the Zeppelin down. HMS E31 then proceeded to rescue seven survivors from the crew of LZ 32.

== Specifications (LZ 37 / M2-class zeppelin) ==
Data from Zeppelin : rigid airships, 1893-1940, The Zeppelin Airships - Part Two: Zeppelins of the Great War 1914–1918

General characteristics

- Crew: 16
- Capacity: 9,200 kg (20,283 lb) typical disposable load
- Length: 158 m (518 ft 4 in)
- Diameter: 14.9 m (48 ft 11 in) maximum
- Fineness ratio: 10.61
- Empty weight: 16,900 kg (37,258 lb)
- Fuel capacity: 4,000 kg (8,818 lb) maximum
- Useful lift: 26,100 kg (57,500 lb)
- Powerplant: 3 × Maybach C-X 6-cylinder water-cooled in-line piston engines, 130 kW (180 hp) each
- Propellers: 2-bladed fixed-pitch propellers

Performance

- Maximum speed: 84 km/h (52 mph, 45 kn)
- Cruise speed: 80.5 km/h (50.0 mph, 43.5 kn)
- Range: 2,200 km (1,400 mi, 1,200 nmi)
- Service ceiling: 2,800 m (9,200 ft) static

Armament

- Guns: 4x machine-guns

== See also ==
- List of Zeppelins

== Bibliography ==
- Foley, Michael (2013). Pioneers of Aerial Combat: Air Battles of the First World War. Pen and Sword. ISBN 9781473828520.
- Hobbs, David (2017). The Royal Navy's Air Service in the Great War. Casemate Publishers. ISBN 9781848323506.
- Wilson, Michael (1988). Destination Dardanelles: The Story of HMS E7. Pen and Sword. ISBN 9781473813557.
