= 1st Light Cruiser Squadron =

- Active: 1913–1924
- Country: United Kingdom
- Allegiance: British Empire
- Branch: Royal Navy
- Engagements: Battle of Jutland

Commanders
- Notable commanders: Hubert G.Brand

The 1st Light Cruiser Squadron was a naval unit of the Royal Navy from 1913 to 1924.

== History ==
The 1st Light Cruiser Squadron was a Royal Navy unit of the Grand Fleet during World War I. Four of its ships (Inconstant, Galatea, Cordelia and Phaeton) fought at Jutland in 1916, by which time it was under the command of Commodore Edwyn Alexander-Sinclair – his flagship, Galatea, was the first to sight enemy vessels, at 2:20pm. During the interwar period, the 1st Light Cruiser Squadron was a unit of the Atlantic Fleet until October 1924. In November 1924 the squadron was dispatched to the Mediterranean Fleet where it was re-designated 1st Cruiser Squadron.

== Commodores/Rear admirals commanding ==
Post holders included:

	Rank	Flag	Name	Term
Commodore/Rear-Admiral Commanding, 1st Light Cruiser Squadron
1	Commodore		William Goodenough	July 1913 – January 1915
2	Commodore		Edwyn Alexander-Sinclair	January 1915 – July 1917
3	Rear Admiral	Rear-Admiral - Royal Navy	Sir Walter Cowan	July 1917 – July 1920
4	Rear Admiral	Rear-Admiral - Royal Navy	Sir James Fergusson	July 1920 – April 1922
5	Rear Admiral	Rear-Admiral - Royal Navy	Sir Hubert Brand	April 1922 – October 1924

== Deployments ==
Distribution of the squadron included:

	Assigned to	Date	Notes
1	First Fleet	1913–1914	1st Fleet as part of Home Fleets
2	Battle Cruiser Fleet	01/1915-11/1916	as part of the Grand Fleet
3	Battle Cruiser Force	11/1916-02/1919	as part of the Grand Fleet
4	Atlantic Fleet	1919–1924	re-designated 1st Cruiser Squadron

== Sources ==
- Mackie, Colin, (2010–2014), British Armed Services between 1860 and the present day — Royal Navy – Senior Appointments, https://www.gulabin.com/.
