= Zeppelin LZ 59 =

World War I German Navy Airship

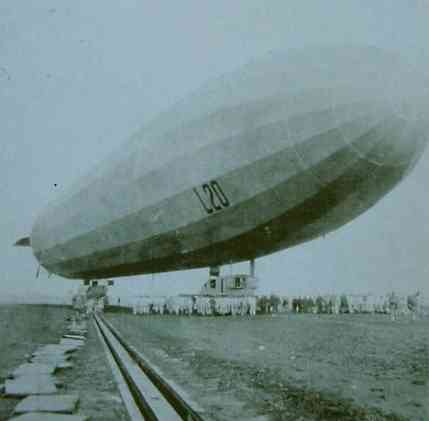
- LZ 59 (L 20) over Luafkatze-skinnen

History

German Empire
- Name: LZ 59
- Operator: Imperial German Navy
- Builder: Luftschiffbau Zeppelin
- Laid down: 1915
- Launched: 1915
- Completed: 21 November 1915
- Acquired: November 1915
- Maiden voyage: 21 December 1915
- In service: 21 December 1915
- Out of service: 3 May 1916
- Identification: L 20
- Nickname(s): Raider of Loughborough
- Fate: Stranded due to fuel exhaustion on 3 May 1916

General characteristics
- Class & type: Type Q
- Type: Airship
- Tonnage: 23,852 kg
- Tons burthen: 17,500 kg of cargo
- Length: 178.5 metres (585 ft 8 in)
- Beam: 18.7 metres (61 ft 4 in)ø
- Installed power: Four 240 hp Maybach HSLu engines
- Propulsion: 4 Lorenzen propellers
- Speed: 95 km/h
- Range: 4,900 kilometres (3,000 mi)
- Capacity: 35,800 m³ Gas Volume in 18 gas cells
- Crew: 18
- Aviation facilities: 2 gondolas

The LZ 59 (L 20) was a World War I German Navy Airship and was the first Q-Class zeppelin with a then record length of 178.5 metres (585 ft 8 in). It was allocated the tactical numbering L 20 and carried out a total of 19 flights, including 2 raids on England and 10 reconnaissance missions.

== Construction ==
The LZ 59 was built by Luftschiffbau Zeppelin in Friedrichshafen, Germany, during the First World War. It was built to join the ranks of the German Kaiserliche Marine in the fight against the United Kingdom. The ship was completed as the first Q-Class zeppelin on 21 November 1915 and had a record length of 178.5 metres (585 ft 8 in). It also had a diameter of 18.7 metres (61 ft 4 in) and 35,800 m³ gas volume contained in 18 gas cells. The ship could reach a top speed of 95 km/h, with four 240 hp (179 kW) Maybach HSLu engines driving four propellers, producing at total of 960 hp (716 kW), giving a range of 4,900 kilometres (3,000 mi). The LZ 59 could reach an altitude of 3,200 metres (10,500 ft). The ship had room to carry 18 crew members in her two gondolas.

== War career ==
The LZ 59 conducted its first flight on 21 December 1915 from Friedrichshafen to Tønder. The first flight was commanded by Kapitänleutnant Franz Stabbert with first officer Lieutenant Ernst Schirlitz, but the ship did not see action in the war until 1916. It was stationed in Tønder from 18 January 1916 to 21 February 1916 and in Seddin near Slupsk, Poland before being flown back to Tønder on 6 April 1916.

=== Bombing raids on the English Midlands ===
The LZ 59 conducted its first bombing raid on Britain on the night of 31 January and 1 February 1916. The ship took off together with L 19 from Tønder and joined 9 other naval airships whose objective was to destroy the docks in Liverpool, as well as other targets in the English midlands. The raid was personally led by airship fleet manager Peter Strasser who was on the L 11.

LZ 59 dropped 7 high explosive bombs on the railway junction at the Bennerley Viaduct and steelworks near Awsworth 10 kilometres (6.2 mi) northwest of Nottingham. The viaduct, however, emerged with only superficial marks from shrapnel, which are visible to this day, and no fatalities were reported. The next target for LZ 59 was the Stanton steelworks, located south of Ilkeston. The ship dropped 15 bombs on its intended target, of which one bomb hit the railway bridge over Nutbrook Canal, killing 2 people. The ship then went on to drop another 4 bombs on Loughborough, which is located about 30 kilometres (19 mi) south of Nottingham. Two of the bombs fell on the Rushes stores in the center of the town and the other two near the Empress plant to the east. The attack on Loughborough led to 12 people being injured and the death of ten of the town's inhabitants, including Mary Anne Page and two of her children, whose names can be seen on a plaque in Loughborough Carillon Park.

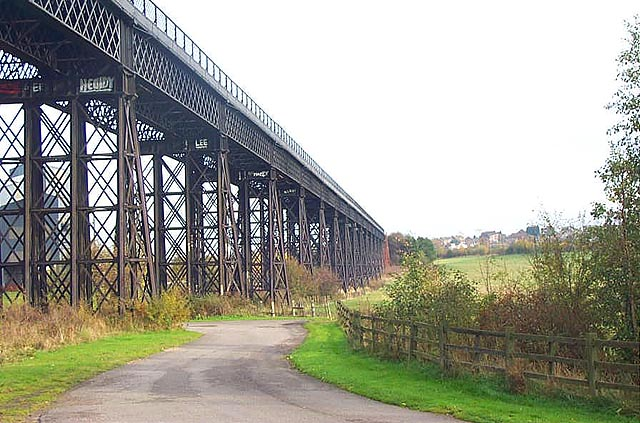
The Bennerley Viaduct, which was spared from the LZ 59's first bombing raid

LZ 59 flew 40 kilometres (25 mi) westward and bombarded Burton-upon-Trent at 8:45 pm. One of the bombs dropped on the city landed between the Christchurch and the mission house in Uxbridge Street, where over 200 people had gathered. The following explosion injured 72 and killed 6 people, including guest missionary Mary Rose Morris from Brighton, who died while hugging her Bible. LZ 59 also dropped 12 firebombs on the town, which damaged some houses and 2 breweries. The bombardment of Burton-upon-Trent ended up killing a total of 15 people.

As the night passed, all of the airships were ordered to return to their bases. In the end, none of the nine airships reached Liverpool, however a great deal of damage was done to the English midlands and many British citizens died in the attacks. The German army ended up losing one airship, the L 19, which was forced to crash land in the North Sea leading to the death of everyone on board. An English ship had rushed to the surviving crew's aid, but ended up abandoning them.

After the air raid LZ 59 was given the nickname Raider of Loughborough due to the city's damage and the high death toll.

=== May 1916 bombing raid and crash ===
LZ 59 started its second bombing raid on Britain during the night of 2 May and 3 May 1916. The ship left its base in Tønder and joined 6 other airships to conduct another bombing raid against a number of factories, smelters and railways in Middlesbrough, Stockton-on-Tees and Hartlepool in northeast England. Another target for the airships were some enemy warships at the mouth of the Firth of Forth near Edinburgh, Scotland.

After the air raid the airships returned safely to their bases except LZ 59, which was having problems with one of its four engines and also encountered strong winds from the southeast, which increased to a moderate gale. The wind blew the ship north past Peterhead and out to the North Sea towards neutral Norway. In the early morning of 3 May 1916, LZ 59 passed northeast of Feistein Lighthouse about 8 kilometres (5.0 mi) from the mainland. It then changed course to the southeast in order to follow the coastal landscape along Jæren, Revtangen and Obrestad Lighthouse at an altitude of 200–300 metres (656 ft 2 in – 984 ft 3 in). Commander Stabbert decided to attempt an emergency landing at Gandsfjorden near Sandnes due to the low amount of gasoline left in the airship's fuel tanks.

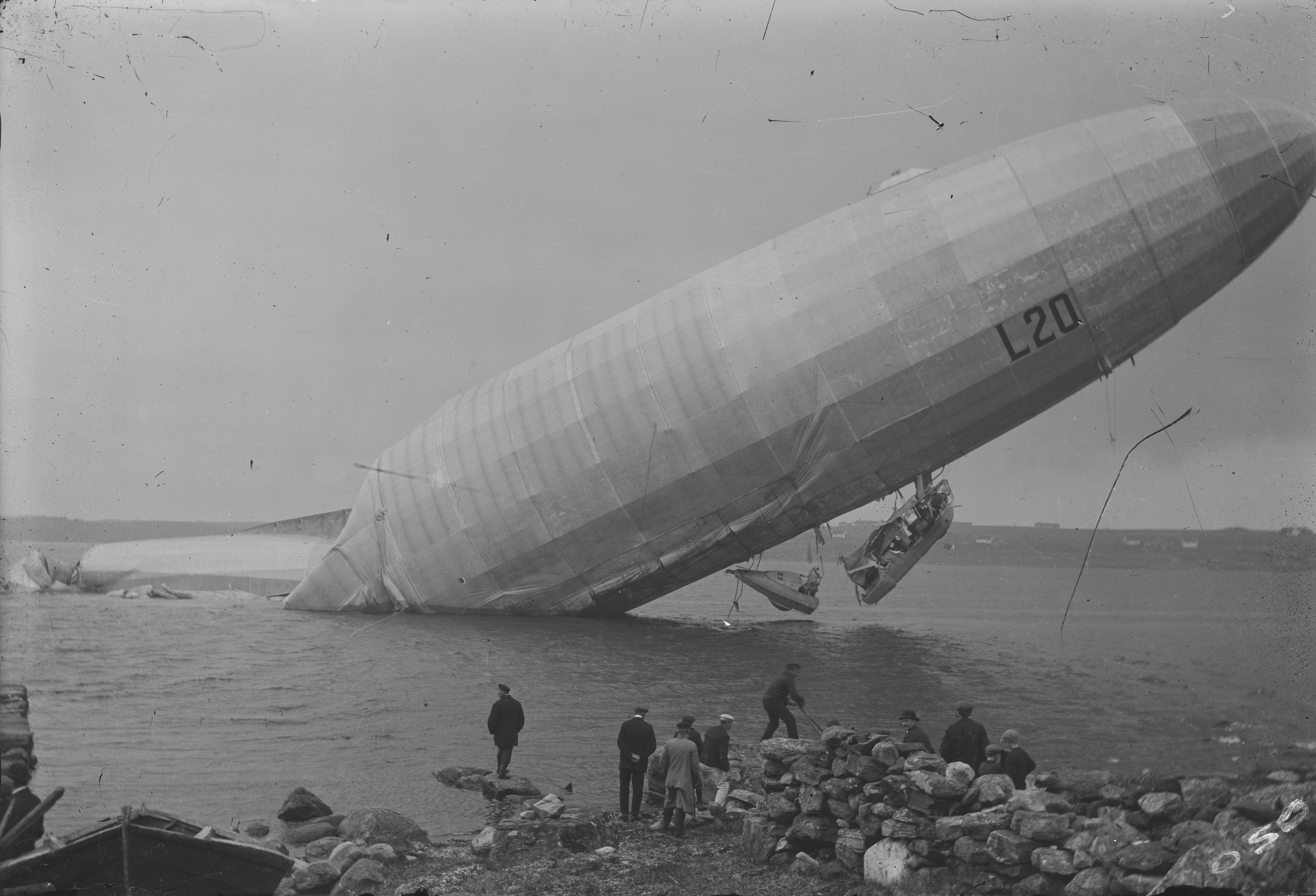
Wreck of the LZ 59

The airship passed west of Sandnes and Lura at a low altitude in order to go beyond Gandsfjorden and into the inner fjords south of Stavanger. Around 11:00 am, the airship touched down in a fairly calm fjord, where it dipped its nose and front gondola a few times in the water. Commander Stabbert ordered the crew to jump in the water, Lieutenant Schirlitz and six sailors followed the commander's orders and jumped overboard. Two officers swam ashore to Dale, while the sailors were rescued by a small fishing boat captained by Jeremiah Bykle. However, there were still 8 men on board the airship, which started to gain height again as it was relieved of weight. The wind took the airship northwest before its anchor caught a large rock on Heddå mountain. The shock of the sudden stop detached one of the gondolas, which fell to the ground with four men on board, of whom 3 died. The airship rose again and flew further to Hafrsfjord before it slowly fell into the water near Jåsund at 11:55 am. Shortly before it hit the water and broke in half, one man jumped out the ship and the last three crewmen were rescued by a torpedo boat.

== Aftermath ==
On 4 May 1916 at 9:00 am the wind turned toward the northeast and drove the wreck of the airship towards the stone coast of Sør-Sunde. As a result, the gondola and motors were crushed and the ship's machine guns fell into the water. In order to prevent the ship from doing any damage to the nearby towns, Norwegian Colonel Johannesen summoned 12 soldiers who, at 3:00 pm, fired at the wreckage from a distance of 120 metres (393 ft 8 in), igniting the remaining hydrogen in a massive explosion.

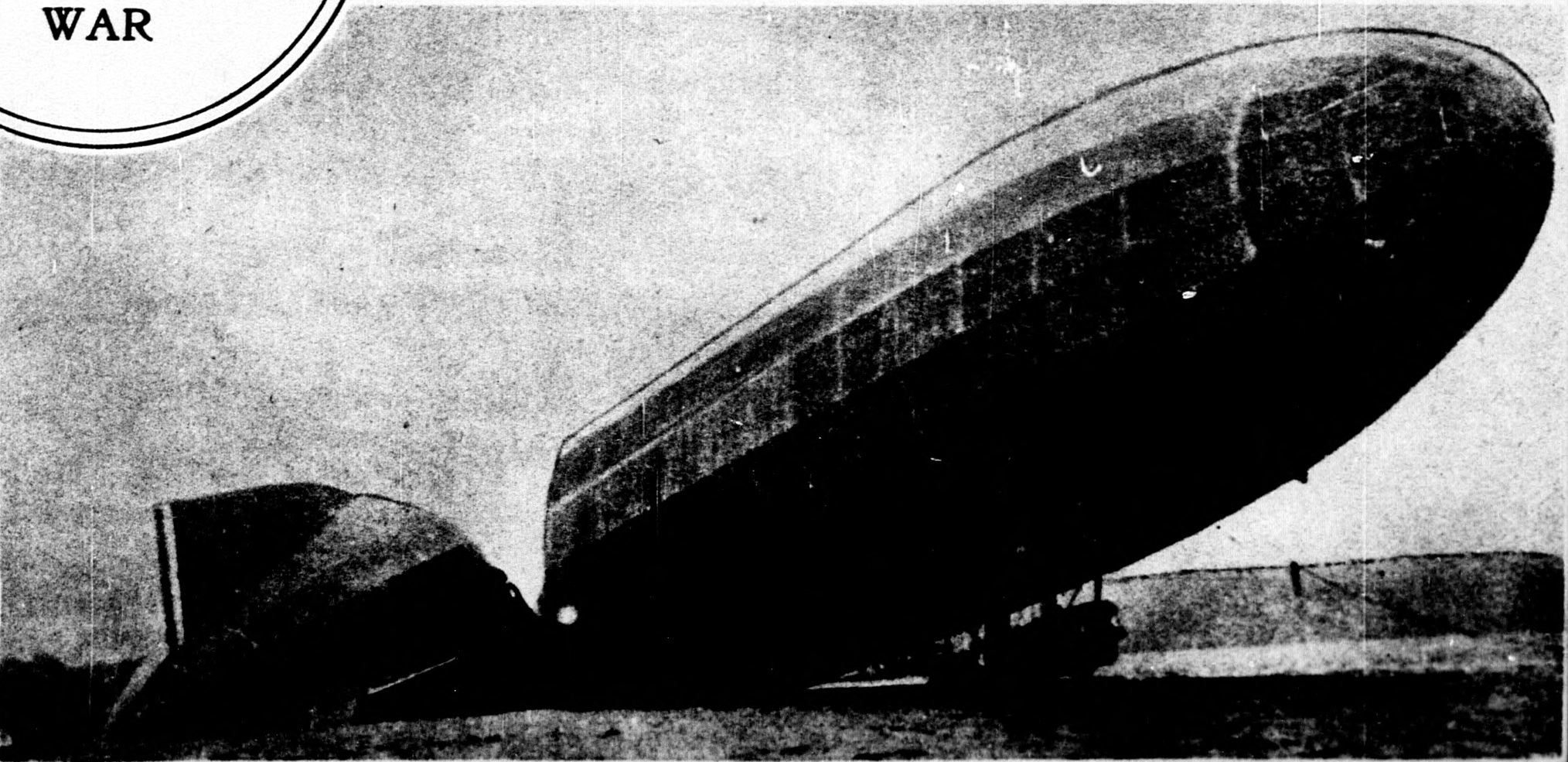
Wreck of the LZ 59 out of the water

=== Internment of the crew ===
Some of the crew were interned on the German auxiliary cruiser Berlin in Trondheimsfjord, where they remained until the end of the war. Six other crew members, including an officer, were interned in Madlalejren and were released shortly after. Commander Stabbert fled after 6 months of internment and returned to the airship base in Tønder on 20 December 1916.

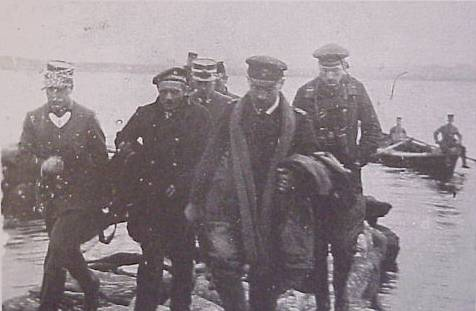
The captured crew of the LZ 59

== Legacy ==
The LZ 59 will always be remembered as the Raider of Loughborough to the people of Britain. The airship dropped a total of 2,864 kg (6,314 lb) of bombs during its two raids and killed an estimated 17 people, as well as damaging many buildings. It made a total of 19 flights, covering a distance of 7,211 km (4,481 mi; 3,894 nmi).
