= Edwyn Alexander-Sinclair =

Royal Navy Admiral (1865–1945)

Admiral Sir Edwyn Alexander-Sinclair GCB MVO
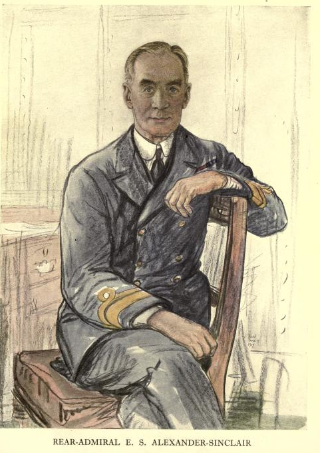
- Edwyn Sinclair Alexander-Sinclair, as sketched by Francis Dodd.
- Born: Edwyn Sinclair Sinclair; 12 December 1865; Malta
- Died: 13 November 1945 (aged 79); Dunbeath Castle, Caithness, Scotland
- Military career
- Allegiance: United Kingdom
- Branch: Royal Navy
- Service years: 1879–1930
- Rank: Admiral
- Commands: HMS Albatross (1902–04); HMS Surprise (1904–05); Royal Naval College, Osborne (1905–08); HMS Victory (1911–13); HMS Temeraire (1913–15); 1st Light Cruiser Squadron (1915–17); 6th Light Cruiser Squadron (1917–20); 1st Battle Squadron, Atlantic Fleet (1922–24); China Station (1925–26); Nore Command (1927–30)
- Conflicts: First World War: Battle of Jutland; Estonian War of Independence
- Awards: Knight Grand Cross of the Order of the Bath; Member of the Royal Victorian Order; Mentioned in dispatches Order of St. Vladimir, Third Class with Swords (Russia)

Admiral Sir Edwyn Sinclair Alexander-Sinclair, GCB, MVO (born Alexander; 12 December 1865 – 13 November 1945) was a Scottish Royal Navy officer, notable for firing the first shots of the Battle of Jutland, and for leading a squadron of light cruisers in the Baltic to support independence of Estonia and Latvia in 1918 to 1919.

== Early life and education ==
Sinclair Alexander-Sinclair was born in Malta, the second son of Captain John Hobhouse Inglis Alexander of the Royal Navy, who served as aide-de-camp to Queen Victoria, and Isabella Barbara Hume, daughter of Thomas Cochrane Hume. He succeeded his elder brother in the Southbar property in 1892 and two years later adopted the additional name of Sinclair on succeeding to the estate of Freswick in Caithness.

His paternal grandparents were Boyd Alexander, Lord of Southbar and Ballochmyle, and Sophia Elizabeth Hobhouse, daughter of Sir Benjamin Hobhouse, 1st Baronet and sister of John Hobhouse, 1st Baron Broughton. His father's elder brother was politician Sir Claud Alexander, 1st Baronet.

== Naval career ==
Alexander-Sinclair entered the Royal Navy as cadet in 1879 at the age of 14, becoming a midshipman 2½ years later. Edwyn Sinclair Alexander-Sinclair was first educated at Twyford School He was made lieutenant in 1890, and served as flag-lieutenant to both Admiral Tracey and Admiral Sir Michael Culme-Seymour, gaining promotion to commander in January 1901. He then had two sea commands, the destroyer Albatross from February 1902 serving at the Mediterranean Station from May that year; and after paying her off in January 1904, the despatch vessel Surprise until 1905.

Alexander-Sinclair was promoted to captain in 1905, and was appointed commander of the Royal Naval College, Osborne, serving there until 1908, when he was appointed a Member of the Royal Victorian Order. Between May 1911 and August 1913 he was captain of HMS Victory, the flagship of the Commander-in-Chief, Portsmouth.

In 1914, at the start of the First World War, Alexander-Sinclair was captain of the dreadnought HMS Temeraire, before flying his flag in HMS Galatea from 1915 as commodore of the 1st Light Cruiser Squadron. He was appointed a Companion of the Order of the Bath for his part in the destruction of Zeppelin L 7 on 4 May 1916. On 31 May 1916 it was the 1st Light Cruiser Squadron under Alexander-Sinclair that first engaged scouting vessels of the German High Seas Fleet and signalled "enemy in sight", leading to the Battle of Jutland, after which he received a mention in dispatches from Vice Admiral Sir David Beatty, commander of the Battlecruiser Fleet, and the Russian Order of St. Vladimir, Third Class with Swords. Promoted to rear admiral on 26 April 1917, he then commanded the 6th Light Cruiser Squadron, flying his flag in HMS Cardiff. In November 1918 Alexander-Sinclair was given the honour of leading the surrendered German Fleet into internment at Scapa Flow, and appointed a Knight Commander of the Order of the Bath.

Soon afterwards, in December 1918, Alexander-Sinclair's 6th Squadron was sent to the Baltic, at the request of Estonian Government, to take part in the Estonian War of Independence. They delivered 6,500 rifles, 200 machine guns and two field guns. The British squadron also captured two Russian destroyers, Spartak and Avtroil, and turned them over to Estonia, which renamed them Vambola and Lennuk. Alexander-Sinclair then blockaded the Russian Navy base at Kronstadt until relieved by the 1st Light Cruiser Squadron under Rear-Admiral Walter Cowan. He was Admiral-Superintendent of Portsmouth Dockyard from 1920 to 1922, and after promotion to vice admiral on 4 April 1922, commanded the 1st Battle Squadron, Atlantic Fleet from 1922 to 1924. He then served as Commander-in-Chief, China Station from 1925 to 1926, and after promotion to admiral on 4 October 1926, was Commander-in-Chief, The Nore from 1927 to 1930. He retired in 1930.

== See also ==
- Estonian War of Independence
- Englannin laivastotoimet Itämerllä 1918 – 1921 (in Finnish)
- His statue (bust) in Estonian Military Cemetery (opened 12.12.2015) (photos)

Military offices
Preceded by Sir David Anderson (Acting)	Commander-in-Chief, China Station; 1925–1926	Succeeded by Sir Reginald Tyrwhitt
Preceded by Sir William Goodenough	Commander-in-Chief, The Nore; 1927–1930	Succeeded by Sir Reginald Tyrwhitt
Honorary titles
Preceded by Sir William Goodenough	First and Principal Naval Aide-de-Camp; 1930	Succeeded by Sir Walter Cowan, Bt.
