= Chenevières =

- Commune
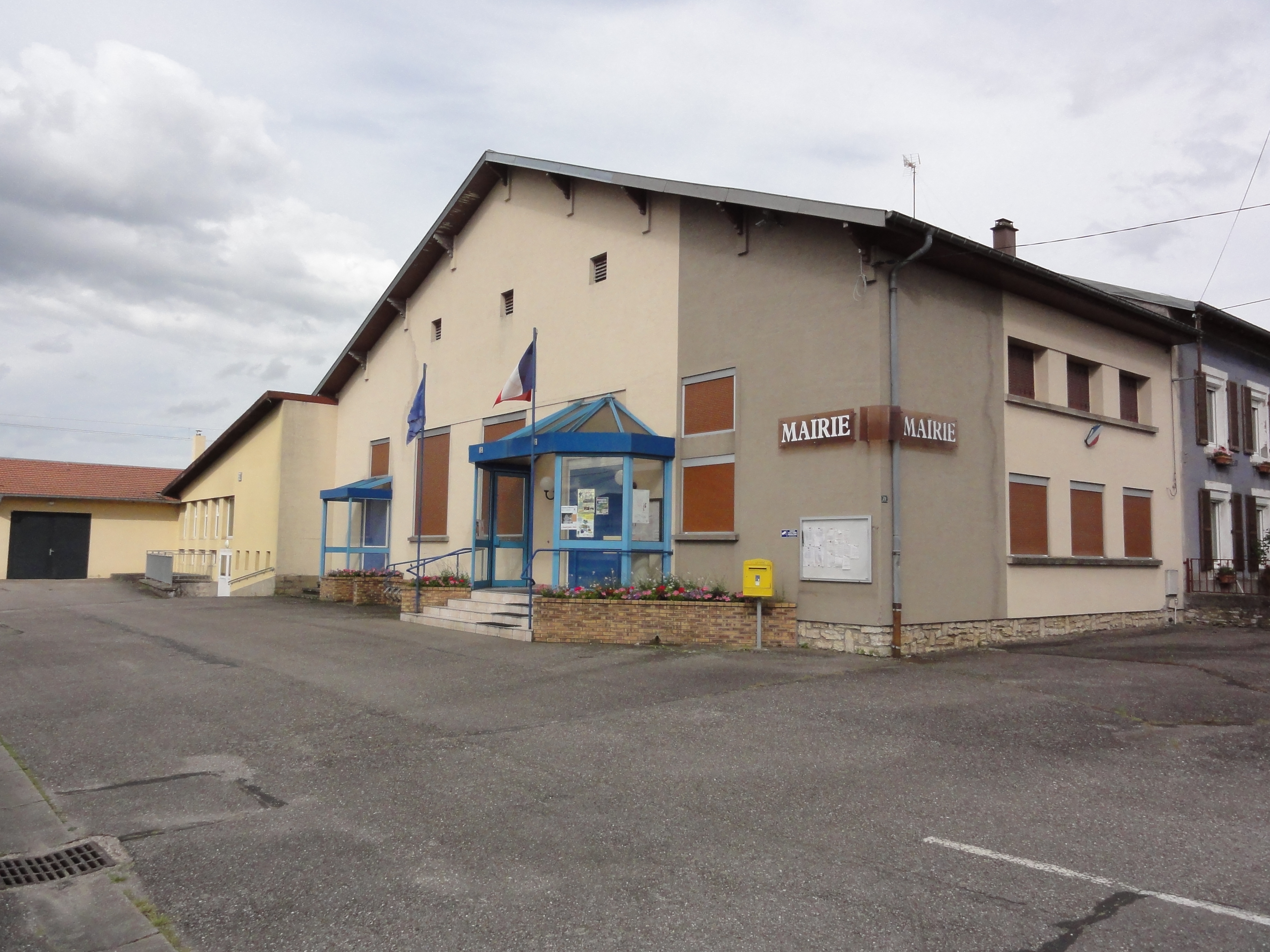
- The town hall in Chenevières

- Coat of arms
- Location of Chenevières
- Location within France Location within Grand Est
- Coordinates: 48°31′10″N 6°37′54″E
- Country: France
- Region: Grand Est
- Department: Meurthe-et-Moselle
- Arrondissement: Lunéville
- Canton: Baccarat
- Intercommunality: Territoire de Lunéville à Baccarat

Government
  - Mayor (2020–2026): Marie-Jo Georges
- Area^{1}: 4.54 km^{2} (1.75 sq mi)
- Elevation: 255 m (837 ft)
- Highest elevation: 284 m (932 ft)
- Lowest elevation: 242 m (794 ft)
- Population (2023): 469
  - Density: 103/km^{2} (268/sq mi)
- Time zone: UTC+01:00 (CET)
  - Summer (DST): UTC+02:00 (CEST)
- INSEE/Postal code: 54125 /54122
- ^{1} French Land Register data, which excludes lakes, ponds, glaciers > 1 km^{2} (0.386 sq mi or 247 acres) and river estuaries.

Chenevières (French pronunciation: [ʃənvjɛʁ]) is a commune in the Meurthe-et-Moselle department in north-eastern France.

== See also ==
- Communes of the Meurthe-et-Moselle department
