= William Goodenough =

Royal Navy Admiral (1867–1945)

Admiral Sir William Goodenough GCB MVO
- Portrait by Walter Stoneman, 1919
- Born: 2 June 1867; Portsmouth, England
- Died: 30 January 1945 (aged 77); Coulsdon, Surrey, England
- Military career
- Allegiance: United Kingdom
- Branch: Royal Navy
- Service years: 1882–1930
- Rank: Admiral
- Commands: HMS Albemarle; HMS Vengeance; HMS Duncan; HMS Cochrane; HMS Colossus; 2nd Light Cruiser Squadron; Africa Station; Nore Command
- Conflicts: World War I; Battle of Heligoland Bight; Battle of Dogger Bank; Battle of Jutland
- Awards: Knight Grand Cross of the Order of the Bath; Member of the Royal Victorian Order
- Spouse: Henrietta Margaret Stanley
- Father: James Graham Goodenough
- Relatives: Edward Stanley (father-in-law); Venetia Stanley (sister-in-law)

Admiral Sir William Edmund Goodenough GCB MVO (2 June 1867 – 30 January 1945) was a senior Royal Navy officer of World War I. He was the son of James Graham Goodenough.

== Naval career ==
Goodenough joined the Royal Navy in 1882. He was appointed Commander of the Royal Naval College, Dartmouth in 1905. He was given command of the cruiser HMS Cochrane in 1910 and of the battleship HMS Colossus in 1911.

He served in World War I and commanded the 2nd Light Cruiser Squadron from 1913 to 1916, participating in the battles of Heligoland Bight in August 1914, Dogger Bank in January 1915, and Jutland in May to June 1916. In the King's Birthday Honours of 3 June 1916, Goodenough was appointed an Additional Member of the Third Class, or Companion, in the Military Division of the Most Honourable Order of the Bath (C.B.). He was promoted to the rank of Rear-Admiral on 10 June.

After the War he became Superintendent at Chatham Dockyard and then, from 1920, Commander-in-Chief at the Africa Station. He was made Vice Admiral commanding the Reserve Fleet in 1923 and Commander-in-Chief, The Nore in 1924. He was First and Principal Naval Aide-de-camp to the King from 1929 to 1930. He retired in 1930.

In retirement Goodenough was president of the Royal Geographical Society from 1930 to 1933. He died in 1945.

Military offices
Preceded by Sir Edward Fitzherbert	Commander-in-Chief, Africa Station; 1920–1922	Succeeded by Sir Rudolph Bentinck
Preceded by Sir Douglas Nicholson	Commander-in-Chief, Reserve Fleet; 1923–1924	Succeeded by Sir Victor Stanley
Preceded by Sir Hugh Evan-Thomas	Commander-in-Chief, The Nore; 1924–1927	Succeeded by Sir Edwyn Alexander-Sinclair
Honorary titles
Preceded by Sir Richard Phillimore	First and Principal Naval Aide-de-Camp; 1929–1930	Succeeded by Sir Edwyn Alexander-Sinclair
