= HMS Galatea (1914) =

Royal Navy Arethusa-class light cruiser

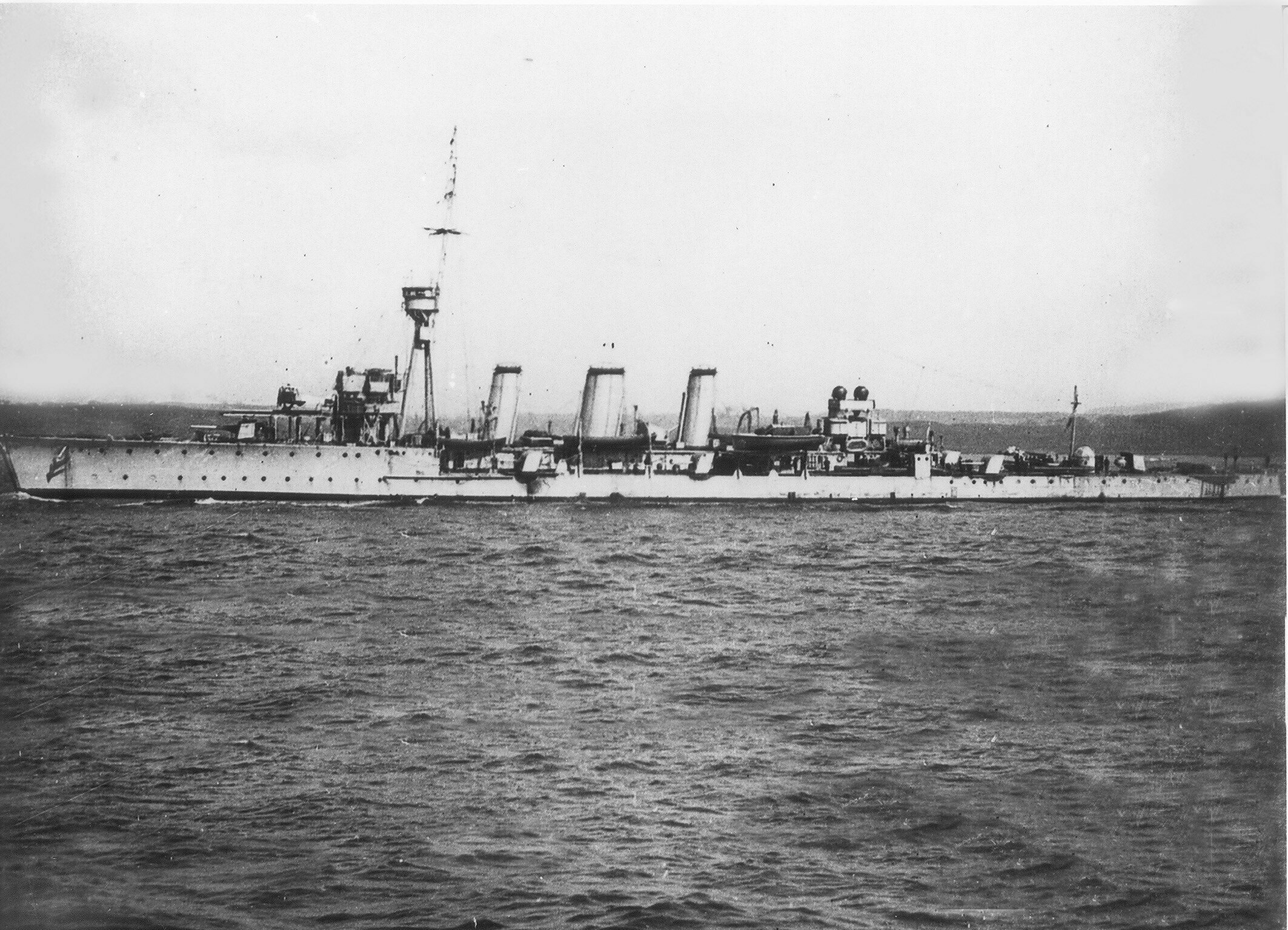
- Galatea in 1914

History

United Kingdom
- Name: Galatea
- Builder: William Beardmore and Company
- Laid down: 9 January 1913
- Launched: 14 May 1914
- Commissioned: December 1914
- Identification: Pennant number: 0C (1914); 66 (Jan 18); 33 (Apr 18); 57 (Nov 19); N.67 (Jan 22)
- Fate: Sold for scrap, 25 October 1921

General characteristics (as built)
- Class & type: Arethusa-class light cruiser
- Displacement: 3,512 long tons (3,568 t)
- Length: 436 ft (132.9 m) (o/a)
- Beam: 39 ft (11.9 m)
- Draught: 15 ft 7 in (4.75 m) (mean, deep load)
- Installed power: 8 × Yarrow boilers; 40,000 shp (30,000 kW)
- Propulsion: 4 × shafts; 4 × steam turbines
- Speed: 28.5 kn (52.8 km/h; 32.8 mph)
- Complement: 270
- Armament: 2 × single 6 in (152 mm) guns; 6 × single 4 in (102 mm) guns; 1 × single 3-pdr (47 mm (1.9 in)) AA gun; 2 × twin 21 in (533 mm) torpedo tubes
- Armour: Waterline belt: 1–3 in (25–76 mm); Deck: 1 in (25 mm)

HMS Galatea was one of eight Arethusa-class light cruisers built for the Royal Navy in the 1910s. She fought in the First World War, participating in the Battle of Jutland. Following the war, she was scrapped.

== Design and description ==
The Arethusa-class cruisers were intended to lead destroyer flotillas and defend the fleet against attacks by enemy destroyers. The ships were 456 feet 6 inches (139.1 m) long overall, with a beam of 49 feet 10 inches (15.2 m) and a deep draught of 15 feet 3 inches (4.6 m). Displacement was 3,512 long tons (3,568 t) at normal and 4,400 long tons (4,500 t) at full load. Arethusa was powered by four Parsons steam turbines, each driving one propeller shaft, which produced a total of 40,000 indicated horsepower (30,000 kW). The turbines used steam generated by eight Yarrow boilers which gave her a speed of about 28.5 knots (52.8 km/h; 32.8 mph). She carried 840 long tons (853 t) tons of fuel oil that gave a range of 5,000 nautical miles (9,300 km; 5,800 mi) at 16 knots (30 km/h; 18 mph).

The main armament of the Arethusa-class ships was two BL 6-inch (152 mm) Mk XII guns that were mounted on the centreline fore and aft of the superstructure and six QF 4-inch Mk V guns in waist mountings. They were also fitted with a single QF 3-pounder 47 mm (1.9 in) anti-aircraft gun and four 21 in (533 mm) torpedo tubes in two twin mounts.

== Service history ==
She was launched on 14 May 1914 at William Beardmore and Company shipyard. On her commissioning she was assigned as the leader to the 2nd Destroyer Flotilla of the Harwich Force, guarding the eastern approaches to the English Channel. On 4 May 1916, she took part in the shooting down of Zeppelin L 7. At the Battle of Jutland, she was the flagship of the 1st Light Cruiser Squadron under Commodore E.S. Alexander-Sinclair. She was the first ship to report the presence of German ships, triggering the battle. Galatea was also the first to receive a hit by the German light cruiser SMS Elbing, but no explosion occurred. She was sold for scrapping on 25 October 1921. Mount Galatea in Alberta, Canada is named after this ship.

== Bibliography ==
- Brown, David K. (2010). The Grand Fleet: Warship Design and Development 1906–1922. Seaforth Publishing. ISBN 978-1-84832-085-7.
- Colledge, J. J.; Warlow, Ben & Bush, Steve (2020). Ships of the Royal Navy: The Complete Record of all Fighting Ships of the Royal Navy from the 15th Century to the Present (5th revised and updated ed.). Seaforth Publishing. ISBN 978-1-5267-9327-0.
- Corbett, Julian. Naval Operations to the Battle of the Falklands. History of the Great War: Based on Official Documents. Vol. I (2nd ed.). Imperial War Museum and Battery Press. ISBN 0-89839-256-X.
- Corbett, Julian (1997) [1929]. Naval Operations. History of the Great War: Based on Official Documents. Vol. II (Second ed.). Imperial War Museum in association with the Battery Press. ISBN 1-870423-74-7.
- Friedman, Norman (2010). British Cruisers: Two World Wars and After. Naval Institute Press. ISBN 978-1-59114-078-8.
- Newbolt, Henry (1996) [1931]. Naval Operations. History of the Great War Based on Official Documents. Vol. V. Battery Press. ISBN 0-89839-255-1.
- Pearsall, Alan (1984). "Arethusa Class Cruisers, Part I". Warship. VIII. Conway Maritime Press: 203–11. ISBN 0-87021-983-9.
- Pearsall, Alan (1984). "Arethusa Class Cruisers, Part II". Warship. VIII. Conway Maritime Press: 258–65. ISBN 0-87021-983-9.
- Preston, Antony (1985). "Great Britain and Empire Forces". In Gray, Randal (ed.). Conway's All the World's Fighting Ships 1906–1921. Naval Institute Press. pp. 1–104. ISBN 0-85177-245-5.
