= Naval Bases and Supply Agency =

Former defence agency in the United Kingdom

Agency overview
- Formed: 1995-2003
- Preceding agency: Chief Executive, Naval Bases and Supply
- Superseding agency: Warship Support Agency
- Jurisdiction: United Kingdom
- Headquarters: Bath, Somerset, England
- Agency executive: Chief Executive Naval Bases and Supply Agency
- Parent agency: Naval Support Command

The Naval Bases and Supply Agency and originally known as the Directorate-General Naval Bases and Supply was a defence agency within the Naval Support Command part of the UK Ministry of Defence. Its headquarters were at Ensleigh, Bath, England from 1995 to 2003 the agency was administered by the Chief Executive Naval Bases and Supply Agency.

== History ==
In October 1995 Directorate-General Naval Bases and Supply was formed as part of Naval Support Command by bringing together management of the Royal Navy's three main bases (Devonport, Portsmouth and the Clyde) including, the Royal Naval Supply and Transport Service its supply depots and the Directorate of Marine Services (Navy). On 11 December 1996 it was renamed the Naval Bases and Supply Agency. The organisation remit was to provide support to the office of the Commander-in-Chief Fleet simultaneously it cooperated closely with the newly formed Ship Support Agency (SSA). In 2001 the agency was absorbed with the Ship Support Agency to form the Warship Support Agency though its remained a part of the new agency until 2003.

When first formed it consisted of 13,350 personnel, 10,200 civilian staff and 3,150 military staff.

== Chief Executive Naval Bases and Supply Agency ==
Included:

1. Rear-Admiral Brian Perowne. 1999-2003 (also Chief of Fleet Support, 2000–2001)

== Responsibilities ==
Included:

- Deliver maritime material support
- Provide accommodation and naval personnel support at naval bases
- Provide ships and submarines with engineering and support services during fleet time.
- Supply worldwide, storage and maintenance of armament, engineering and general stores, weapons and equipment's.
- Supply of food and fuel.

== See also ==
Defence Logistics Organisation
