= Tony Douglas (businessman) =

British businessman

- Occupation: Businessman
- Known for: CEO of Riyadh Air

Tony Douglas is a British businessman. He is the chief executive officer (CEO) of Riyadh Air, a Saudi Public Investment Fund subsidiary. He previously was the CEO of Etihad Airways from January 2018 to October 2022. He was chief executive of Abu Dhabi Airports Company (2013–2015), and was chief executive of Defence Equipment and Support department in the United Kingdom's Ministry of Defence (2015–2017). He has held senior positions with airport operator BAA, and was Chief Operating Officer of Laing O'Rourke.

== Life ==
Douglas joined British Aerospace in their regional jet production facilities in 1990, became manufacturing and logistics director at Kenwood plc in 1996 and then joined BAA plc in 1998 becoming Group Supply Chain Director, then Group Technical Director, then Managing Director of Heathrow Terminal 5 and finally Chief Executive of Heathrow Airport.

Douglas went on to be Chief Operating Officer at Laing O'Rourke in August 2007. After that he became Chief Executive of the Abu Dhabi Ports Company (in which role he led the Khalifa Port and Industrial Zone project) in June 2010 and Chief Executive of Abu Dhabi Airports Company in 2013. He became Chief Executive of Defence Equipment and Support in September 2015. Etihad Airways announced in October 2017 that they had appointed Douglas Group Chief Executive Officer with effect from January 2018.

His tenure at Etihad Airways was focused on minimizing losses at the airline. Following his appointment as CEO, he managed to trim the losses by reducing total costs by $416 million to $6.9 billion.

In September 2022, it was reported that Douglas had accepted an offer to join the board of Riyadh Air, a planned Saudi national carrier to be based out of the capital city of Riyadh, aiming to launch operations in 2025. The reports were neither confirmed nor denied by either Etihad or the Saudi Public Investment Fund (PIF). He was appointed CEO of the Saudi Public Investment Fund's Riyadh Air in March 2023.

Douglas holds a Master of Business Administration (MBA) degree from Lancaster University.

In 2022, Douglas and his counterpart Tim Clark at the Emirates airline applied for UAE nationality and were granted it.

Government offices
Preceded by Bernard Gray	CEO, Defence Equipment and Support; 2015–2018	Succeeded by Michael Bradley
