= Warship Support Agency =

Former defence agency in the UK

Agency overview
- Formed: 2001-2005
- Preceding agency: Naval Bases and Supply Agency; Ship Support Agency
- Jurisdiction: United Kingdom
- Headquarters: Foxhill, Bath, England
- Agency executive: Chief Executive Warship Support Agency
- Parent agency: Defence Logistics Organisation

The Warship Support Agency (WSA) was a non-executive agency within the Defence Logistics Organisation (DLO) of the UK Ministry of Defence from 2001 to 2005.

== History ==
It was created on 1 April 2001 from the amalgamation of the Naval Bases and Supply Agency and the Ship Support Agency and had its headquarters initially in Bath, England, but later moved to the MoD Abbey Wood site in Bristol. As well as project teams the WSA operated the three naval bases in Portsmouth, Plymouth and on the Clyde. In 2003 the department was placed under the superintendence of the Deputy Chief of Defence Logistics. The WSA was amalgamated in 2005 as part of a major restructuring exercise and became part of the Defence Logistics Organisation.

== Chief Executive Warship Support Agency ==
Included:

1. John C. Coles: CB. FR Eng. 2001-2005 (held joint title of Director General Equipment Support (Sea)

=== Deputy Chief Executive of Warship Support Agency ===
Included:

1. Rear-Admiral Jonathon Reeve 2004-2005

== Organisations and Offices under the Warship Support Agency ==
At various times included:

1. Defence Helicopter Support Authority
2. Director (Defence Munitions)
3. Director Naval Aviation Support
4. Director Operations Rotary Wing
5. Director-General Aircraft (Navy)
6. Flag Officer Scotland, Northern England and Northern Ireland
7. Naval Base Commander (Clyde)
8. Naval Base Commander (Devonport)
9. HMNB Portsmouth
10. Naval Bases and Supply Agency
