= Michael Bradley (businessman) =

British businessman

Michael Paul Bradley CB
- Occupation: Businessman
- Known for: Chief Executive of Defence Equipment and Support (2018)
- Awards: Companion of the Order of the Bath (2017)

Michael Paul Bradley CB is a British businessman. He has been Chief Executive of Defence Equipment and Support.

== Career ==
In 1995 Bradley joined Alstom Rail where he latterly was Finance Director of their Traction business. He went on to become Finance Director of Enterprise, the support services business, in 2004, Director General (Resources) and Finance Director of Defence Equipment and Support in January 2012 and then Chief Executive in January 2018. In May 2018 he was replaced as Chief Executive by Sir Simon Bollom.

Bradley was appointed a Companion of the Order of the Bath (CB) in the 2017 New Year Honours.

== Offices held ==
Government offices
Preceded by Tony Douglas	CEO, Defence Equipment and Support; January 2018 – May 2018	Succeeded by Sir Simon Bollom
