= Blue fleet =

Blue Fleet may refer to:

- Blue Fleet, NATO naval forces in a 1957 NATO exercise named "Operation Strikeback"
- Blue fleet (Canada), civilian vehicles held by the Canadian Department of National Defence and the Canadian Forces
