= RAF Logistics Command =

Former command of the Royal Air Force

- RAF Logistics Command badge
- Active: 1 April 1994 – 31 October 1999
- Disbanded: 31 October 1999
- Country: United Kingdom
- Branch: Royal Air Force
- Type: Command
- Role: Logistics support
- Headquarters: RAF Brampton and RAF Wyton
- Motto(s): Sustentamus et Bellent (Latin for 'We sustain that they may fight')

The Royal Air Force's Logistics Command was a command formed to provide logistics support for the RAF.

== History ==
The Command was formed on 1 April 1994 and its role was to provide logistics support to the RAF. The formation of Logistics Command resulted from the Government's PROSPECT study which was aimed to achieve a 20% reduction in the UK armed forces' headquarters staff to match the previous 'Options for Change' front-line cuts. This provided the mandate to create a centre of excellence in logistics management within the RAF with the task of delivering the best standards of support for the front-line whilst at the same time achieving significant reductions in cost.

The Command brought together most of the logistics functions of the Air Member for Supply and Organisation with those of RAF Support Command. These included the Maintenance Group Defence Agency, Support Command Communication and Information Systems, the Radio Introduction Unit, and the Central Servicing Development Establishment. Logistics Command was headquartered across two sites, RAF Brampton and RAF Wyton; on the later base 4 purpose-built open-planned pavilions were built. Its motto was Sustentamus ut Bellent which means 'We sustain that they may fight'.

The Strategic Defence Review (SDR) in 1997 marked the beginning of a process of radical and far-reaching modernization of the way the Armed Forces conducted defence activities including the creation of unified logistics support. Many of the RAF's innovations in Logistics Command were incorporated into the SDR's 'Smart Procurement Initiative'.

Logistics Command was disbanded on 31 October 1999 and thereafter the majority of its functions were subsumed by the tri-Services Defence Logistics Organisation which stood up formally on 1 April 2000.

== Air Officers Commanding-in-Chief ==
Air Officers Commanding-in-Chief were:

- 1 April 1994 – 8 March 1996 Air Chief Marshal Sir Michael Alcock GCB KBE DSc FEng FIMechE FRAeS
- 8 March 1996 – 11 July 1997 Air Chief Marshal Sir John Allison KCB CBE FRAeS
- 11 July 1997 – 30 April 1999 Air Marshal Sir Colin Terry KBE CB BSc(Eng) FRAeS FRSA FILog FCGI
- 30 April 1999 – 3 September 1999 Air Marshal Malcolm Pledger OBE AFC BSc FRAeS RAF
- 3 September 1999 – 31 October 1999 Air Vice-Marshal Graham Skinner CBE MSc BSc CEng FILT FIMechE FIMgt MRAeS

== See also ==
- List of Royal Air Force commands

Preceded by Support Command	Logistics Command; 1994 – 1999	Succeeded by Defence Logistics Organisation
