= Chief of Defence Logistics =

The Chief of Defence Logistics was a senior post in the British armed forces. As of 1 April 2007 the Defence Logistics Organisation was merged with the Defence Procurement Agency to form a new organisation called Defence Equipment and Support. This was led by the Chief of Defence Materiel.

CDL, as it is abbreviated, was responsible for all of the organisation and running of the logistical support to all three branches of the armed forces, the Royal Navy, the Army, and Royal Air Force. CDL was the head of the Defence Logistics Organisation.

The post was created in 2000 by the MOD who brought together all the logistics departments and MOD central agencies together under a joint command.

The command could be held by a four-star officer: Admiral, General, or Air Chief Marshal appointed from the three services. In fact, however, no officer from the Royal Navy held this position. The post was subsumed into Defence Equipment and Support on 1 April 2007.

== Chief of Defence Logistics 2000 - 2007 ==
- General Sir Samuel Cowan (2000 - 2002)
- Air Chief Marshal Sir Malcolm Pledger (2002 - 2005)
- General Sir Kevin O'Donoghue (2005 - 31 March 2007)
