= Julian Young (RAF officer) =

British Royal Air Force officer

Sir Julian Young
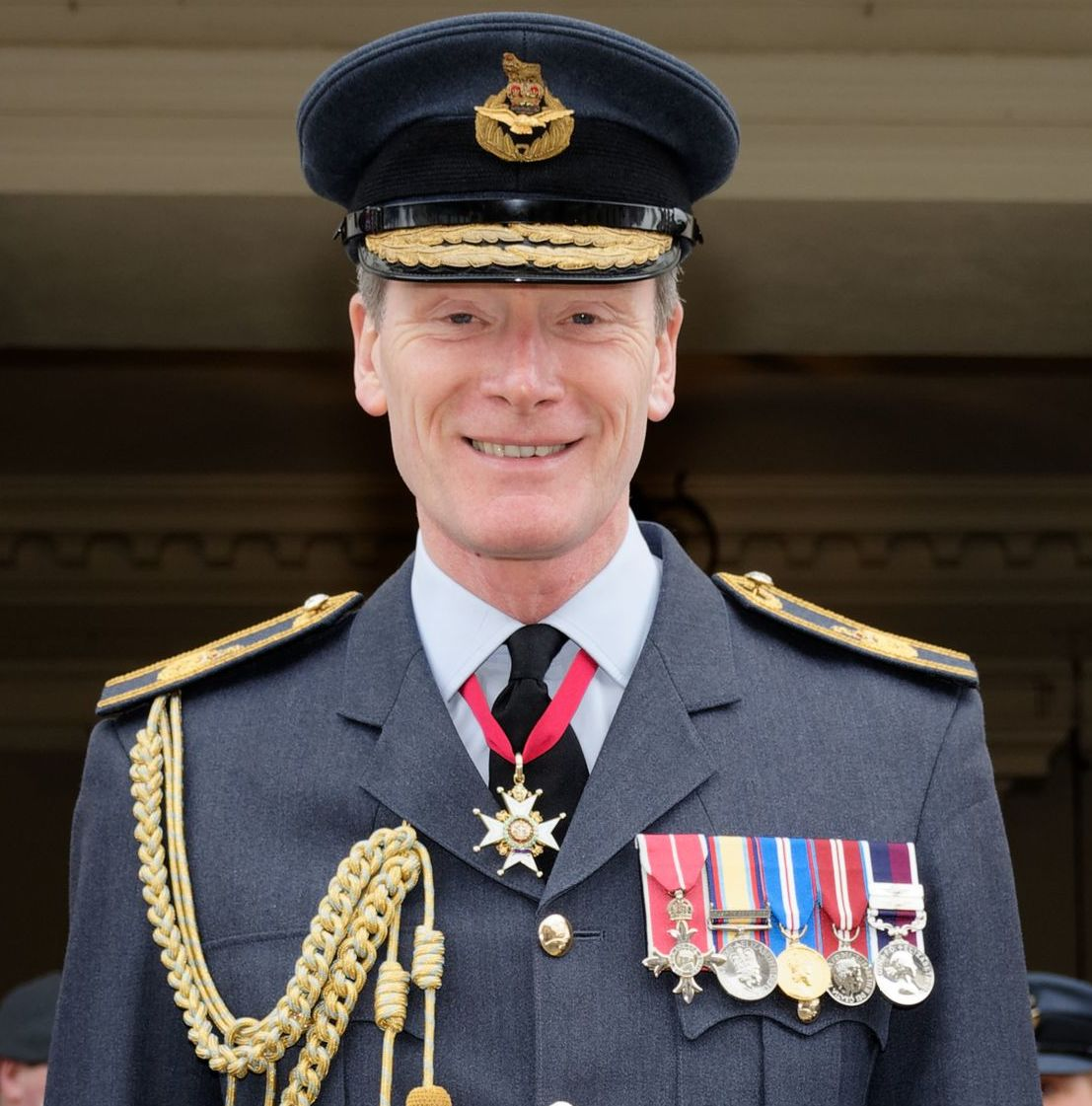
- Young in 2018
- Military career
- Allegiance: United Kingdom
- Branch: Royal Air Force
- Service years: 1980–2021
- Rank: Air Marshal
- Commands: Air Member for Materiel (2016-20); RAF Cosford (2002-03)
- Conflicts: Gulf War
- Awards: Companion of the Order of the Bath; Knight Commander of the Order of the British Empire

Air Marshal Sir Julian Alexander Young, KBE, CB, FREng, FIET, CCMI, FRAeS is a retired senior Royal Air Force (RAF) officer who served as Chief of Materiel (Air) at Defence Equipment and Support, concurrently holding the appointments of Air Member for Materiel on the Air Force Board and Chief Engineer (RAF).

== Personal life ==
Young attended the Royal Latin School, Buckingham where he was head boy.

== RAF career ==
Young was commissioned into the RAF on 31 August 1980.

He was appointed Officer of the Order of the British Empire (OBE) in the 2000 New Year Honours, and became Station Commander at RAF Cosford in 2002. He went on to be Assistant Chief of Staff at RAF Air Command in February 2007, Director of Defence Support Review in August 2009 and Chief of Staff Support at RAF Air Command in December 2010. After that he became Technical Director & Chief Information Officer at Defence Equipment and Support in December 2012, Director Helicopters at Defence Equipment and Support in February 2015 and Chief of Materiel (Air) at Defence Equipment and Support in April 2016, joining the Air Force Board as Air Member for Materiel and Chief Engineer (RAF).

On 1 October 2021, he was appointed as the 140th President of the Institution of Engineering and Technology.

Young was appointed Companion of the Order of the Bath (CB) in the 2013 New Year Honours and was elected a Fellow of the Royal Academy of Engineering in 2016. He was appointed Knight Commander of the Order of the British Empire (KBE) in the 2020 New Year Honours.

Military offices
Preceded by Sir Simon Bollom	Chief of Materiel – Air, Defence Equipment and Support; Air Member for Materiel; 2016–2020	Succeeded by Richard Thompson
