= Samuel Cowan =

Full general of the British Army (born 1941)

General Sir Samuel Cowan KCB CBE
- Born: 9 October 1941 (age 85)
- Military career
- Allegiance: United Kingdom
- Branch: British Army
- Service years: 1963–2002
- Rank: General
- Service number: 474845
- Unit: Royal Corps of Signals
- Awards: Knight Commander of the Order of the Bath; Commander of the Order of the British Empire

General Sir Samuel Cowan KCB CBE (born 9 October 1941) is a former Quartermaster-General to the Forces.

== Career ==
Educated at Lisburn Technology College and the Open University, Cowan was commissioned into the Royal Corps of Signals in 1963. In 1980, he became commanding officer of the Headquarters & Signals Regiment for 2nd Armoured Division.

In 1989 he was selected to be commandant of the Royal Military College of Science and then in 1991 he became Assistant Chief of Defence Staff, Operational Requirements (Land Systems). From 1995 he undertook a tour as Inspector General for Doctrine & Training.

He was Quartermaster-General to the Forces from 1996 to 1998 when he became Chief of Defence Logistics. He retired in 2002.

He was an aide-de-camp general to the Queen.

He was also colonel commandant of the Royal Corps of Signals, the Brigade of Gurkhas and of the Army Legal Corps.

== Nepal studies ==
Cowan was associated with Gurkhas via various positions in his job role. He first visited Nepal in 1966. During his annual visits to Nepal as colonel commandant, he had audiences with the reigning monarchs of Nepal, delivered a report on the Brigade of Gurkhas, and trekked numerous times. After his retirement, he published Essays on Nepal, in which he covered Nepal affairs including its frontiers, the Maoist insurgency, human rights, corruption in high places, and the manner of governance.

Cowan is a frequent and prolific contributor to The Record (Nepal), an independent digital publication from Kathmandu. He has written over a dozen articles for the publication on a wide range of Nepal-related subjects, including the history of the Rana regime, reflections on the British Gurkhas, border issues between Nepal and India, and those between Nepal and China.

Military offices
Preceded by Jeremy Blacker	Commandant of the Royal Military College of Science; 1989–1991	Succeeded by Edmund Burton
Preceded by Sir William Rous	Quartermaster-General to the Forces; 1996–1998	Succeeded by Sir Scott Grant
New title DLO formed	Chief of Defence Logistics; 2000–2002	Succeeded by Sir Malcolm Pledger
