= Joseph Cockshoot & Co =

Joseph Cockshoot was an English coachbuilder and car dealer based in Manchester.

The company can trace its roots back to 1724 when a business was started making and selling horse-drawn coaches. In 1844 Joseph Cockshoot left the company and set up on his own with premises in Major Street, Manchester. In 1855 the business moved to Fountain Street and in 1865 to New Bridge Street. In 1873 the business became a private company, Joseph Cockshoot and Co., with Joseph Cockshoot and William Norris, who had joined in 1851, in charge.

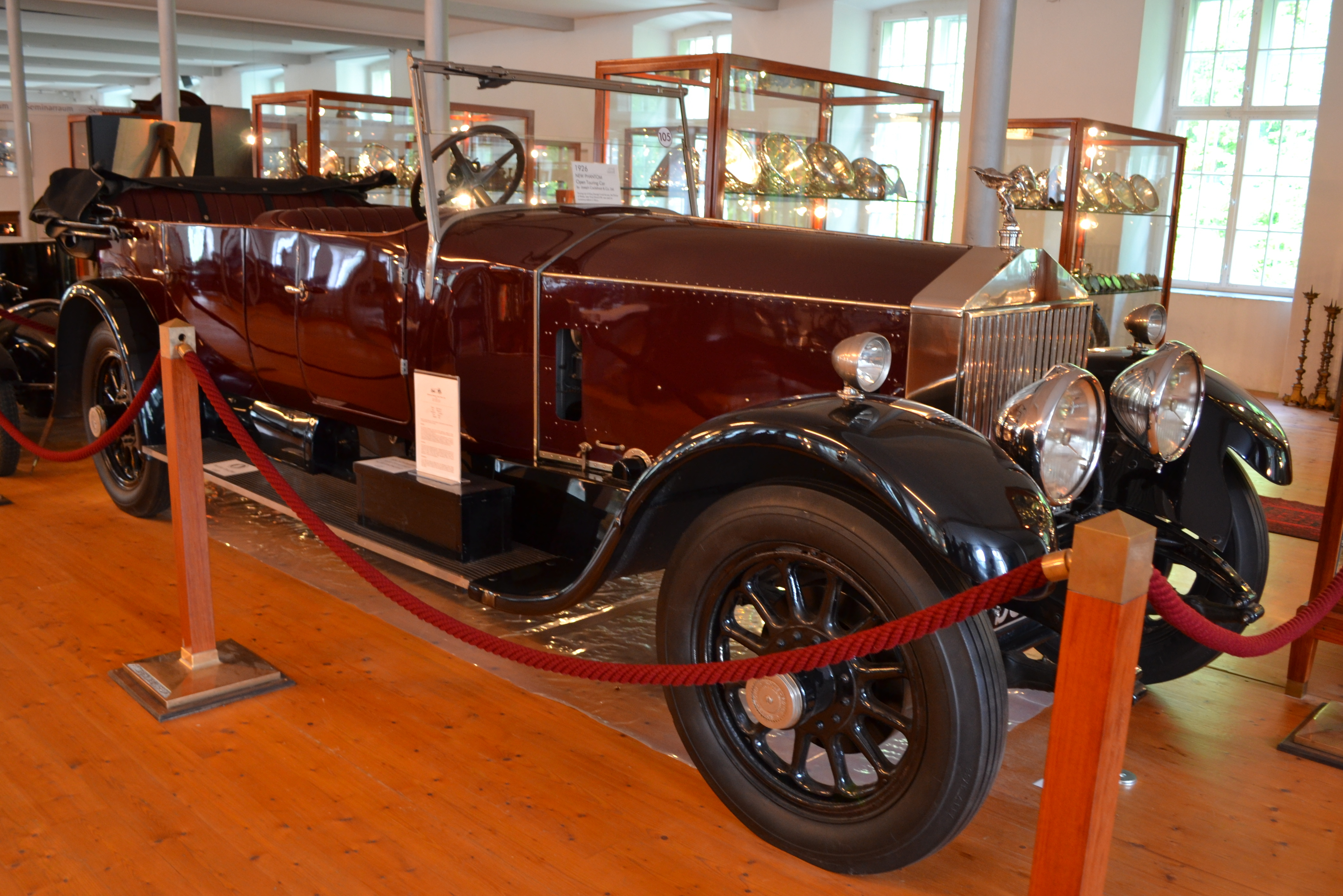
1926 Rolls Royce Phantom I by Cockshoot

The company gained a reputation for high quality craftsmanship and design and orders included building carriages for the High Sheriff of Lancashire. They won many awards and exhibited at major events such as the Jubilee Exhibition in Manchester in 1887 and in Paris Exhibition of 1878. William Norris died in 1894.

In 1895 they became a limited company, Joseph Cockshoot and Co. Ltd, with Joseph Cockshoot as Chairman and Sydney Norris, son of William, and Richard Randell as joint managing directors.

With the coming of the motor car Cockshoots quickly saw a new market opportunity and opened a car showroom on Deansgate in 1902 with agencies for, among others, Stanley steam cars. They supplied their first car body in 1903. In 1907 they became Rolls-Royce agents and supplied many bodies on their chassis including on a 40/50 chassis the car known as the "Pearl of the East" probably the first Rolls-Royce to be exported to India. The long association with Rolls-Royce would continue with a Cockshoot bodied chassis appearing at every London Motor Show from 1911 to 1938 (except 1919).

In 1906 they moved again to new premises on the corner of Great Ducie Street and New Bridge Street and horse-drawn carriage production was run down although a few continued to be made into the 1920s.

During World War I production turned to war work mainly building tender bodies on chassis supplied by nearby Crossley Motors as well as some staff cars and ambulances. The early post war years saw plenty of work converting many of these vehicles to civilian use.

In the inter war years the coachbuilding work at first flourished often with more orders than they could fulfill and Cockshoots also gained dealerships for Armstrong Siddeley and Morris with the resulting opening of a large showroom in St Anne's Square in 1928. However, the 1930s showed a steady decline in the coachbuilding business.

In World War II Cockshoots concentrated on building aircraft parts mainly for nearby Avro and to make space much of the coachbuilding equipment was removed.

After the war there was no attempt to return to coachbuilding and the company concentrated on car sales, repairs and servicing continuing as Rolls-Royce, Bentley, MG and Morris agents. In 1959 they became a public company.

In 1968 Joseph Cockshoot was sold to Lex Garages Ltd.
