= Bernard Gray =

British businessman

Sir Bernard Gray
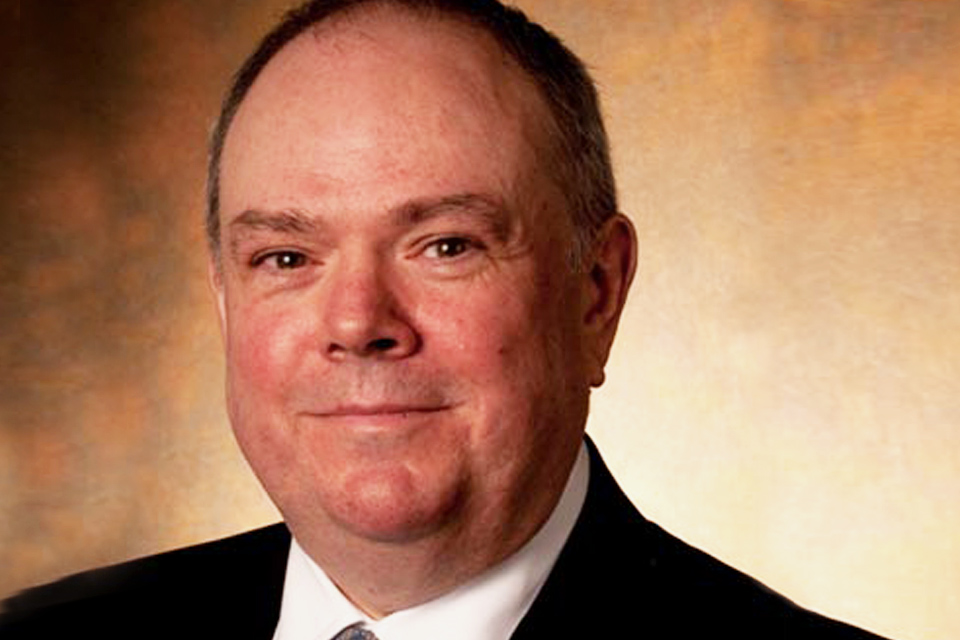

Chief of Defence Materiel
- In office 2011–2015
- Prime Minister: David Cameron
- Preceded by: Kevin O'Donoghue
- Succeeded by: Tony Douglas as Chief Executive Officer of Defence Equipment and Support

Personal details
- Born: 6 September 1960 (age 66) Redhill, Surrey
- Education: University of Oxford

Sir Bernard Peter Gray (born 6 September 1960 in Redhill, Surrey) is a British businessman, journalist, and former government worker.

== Education ==
Gray read chemistry at the University of Oxford.

== Career ==
Gray worked for five years in investment banking and capital markets, for Bankers Trust and Chase Manhattan, in London and New York City.

He spent nearly ten years as a journalist at the Financial Times Group, including as a defence correspondent. He was recognised in the Aerospace Journalist of the Year Awards in 1996 for the Best Defence Submission.

From 1997 to 1999 Gray was a special adviser to former Defence Secretaries George Robertson and Geoff Hoon, during which time Gray directed the Strategic Defence Review of 1998.

From 1999 to 2001 he was Strategy Director of the UK publishing and events division of United Business Media, CMP Information. He was heavily involved in the proposed Carlton-UBM merger. From 2003 to 2006 he was a non-executive director of Cable & Wireless; he was also chairman of the company's remuneration committee. He has also served as non-executive director for the UK broadcaster Five.

In October 2005, Gray was appointed as chief executive of TSL Education Limited, publisher of the Times Educational Supplement, when it was acquired by Exponent.

From 2017 to 2021, Gray was Chairman and owner of New Scientist. New Scientist was acquired by the publisher of the Daily Mail in March 2021.

=== Report on UK defence acquisition ===
In 2008 Defence Secretary John Hutton commissioned Gray as a special adviser to the Labour Party, based at the Ministry of Defence (MoD), to undertake an independent review of defence acquisition, which was published in October 2009. Although publication was initially moved from July 2009 until after the general election – prompting The Spectator to suggest that it had been "suppressed" – the confidential report was leaked to The Sunday Telegraph in August 2009. The Times highlighted some of the more "damning" extracts from the report:

- The department is running a "substantially overheated equipment programme, with too many types of equipment being ordered for too large a range of tasks at too high a specification".
- The MoD is "harming our ability ... to conduct difficult current operations".
- "The problems, and the sums of money involved, have almost lost their power to shock, so endemic is the issue."
- "It seems as though military equipment acquisition is vying in a technological race with the delivery of civilian software systems for the title of ’world’s most delayed technical solution’. Even British trains cannot compete."
- "How can it be that it takes 20 years to buy a ship, or aircraft, or tank? Why does it always seem to cost at least twice what was thought? Even worse, at the end of the wait, why does it never quite seem to do what it was supposed to?"
- "Agile enemies such as the Taliban are unlikely to wait for our sclerotic acquisition systems to catch up".

It was formally presented to Parliament in October 2009, with the MoD accepting its two main themes: a need to bring equipment plans into line with likely available resources, and a need to improve equipment programme planning, management and delivery.

=== Chief of Defence Materiel ===
In December 2010 Gray was appointed to the role of Chief of Defence Materiel in the MoD, leading Defence Equipment and Support. He replaced General Sir Kevin O'Donoghue. The four-year appointment commenced on 4 January 2011. As of 2015, Gray was paid a salary of between £220,000 and £224,999 by the department, making him one of the 328 highest-paid people in the British public sector at that time. In September 2015 it was announced that he was to be succeeded by Tony Douglas at the end of that year.

== Post-government activities ==
In April 2016, shortly after he left the MoD, Gray's consultancy business was tasked with reviewing the changes proposed in his own 2009 defence procurement report. Private Eye reported in December 2016 that Gray had failed to seek approval for this from the Advisory Committee on Business Appointments, which refused to approve the role retrospectively, although the committee had no powers to stop it.

It was also reported that Gray's business was working for the management consultant McKinsey & Company, which had been a significant beneficiary of MoD contracts under Gray, regarding defence procurement for the US Army.

== Honours ==
In the 2015 Birthday Honours, he was knighted "for public service, particularly to Defence".

== Bibliography ==
- Beginners' Guide to Investment (1991 and 1993)
- Review of Acquisition for the Secretary of State for Defence, October 2009

Government offices
Preceded by Kevin O'Donoghue	Chief of Defence Materiel; 2011–2015	Succeeded by Tony Douglas
