= Olympia-Werke =

Defunct German manufacturer

Olympia-Werke AG
- Type: Aktiengesellschaft
- Industry: Office equipment
- Founded: 1903; 123 years ago
- Defunct: 1992; 34 years ago
- Fate: Dissolution

Olympia-Werke AG was an important German manufacturer of typewriters and other office equipment. Since the plant in Roffhausen near Wilhelmshaven was closed in 1991, only the brand name has survived.

== Beginnings (1903–1945) ==
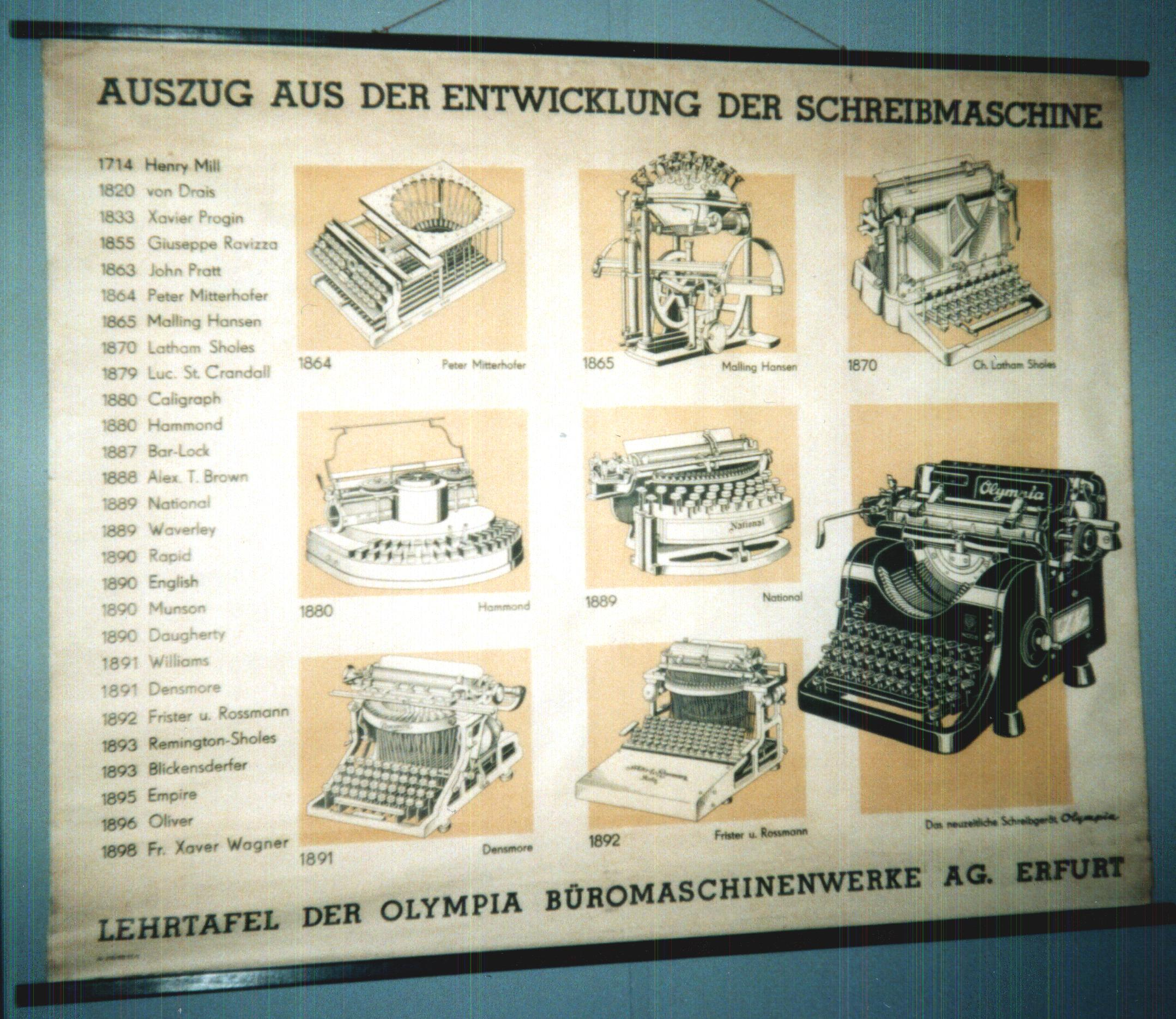
A chart depicting the development of the typewriter, produced by Olympia-Büromaschinenwerke

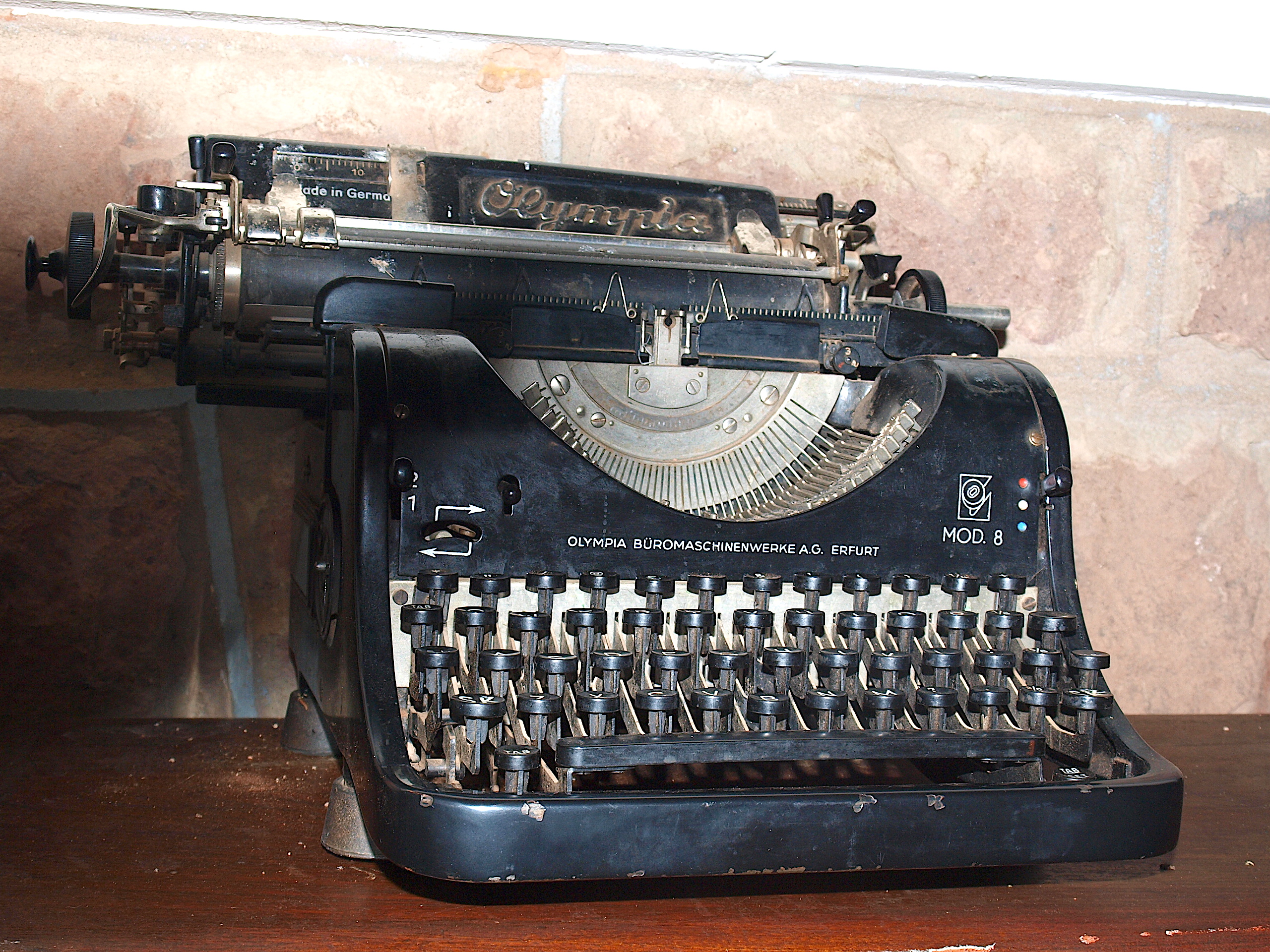
An Olympia typewriter, photographed in Duwisib Castle

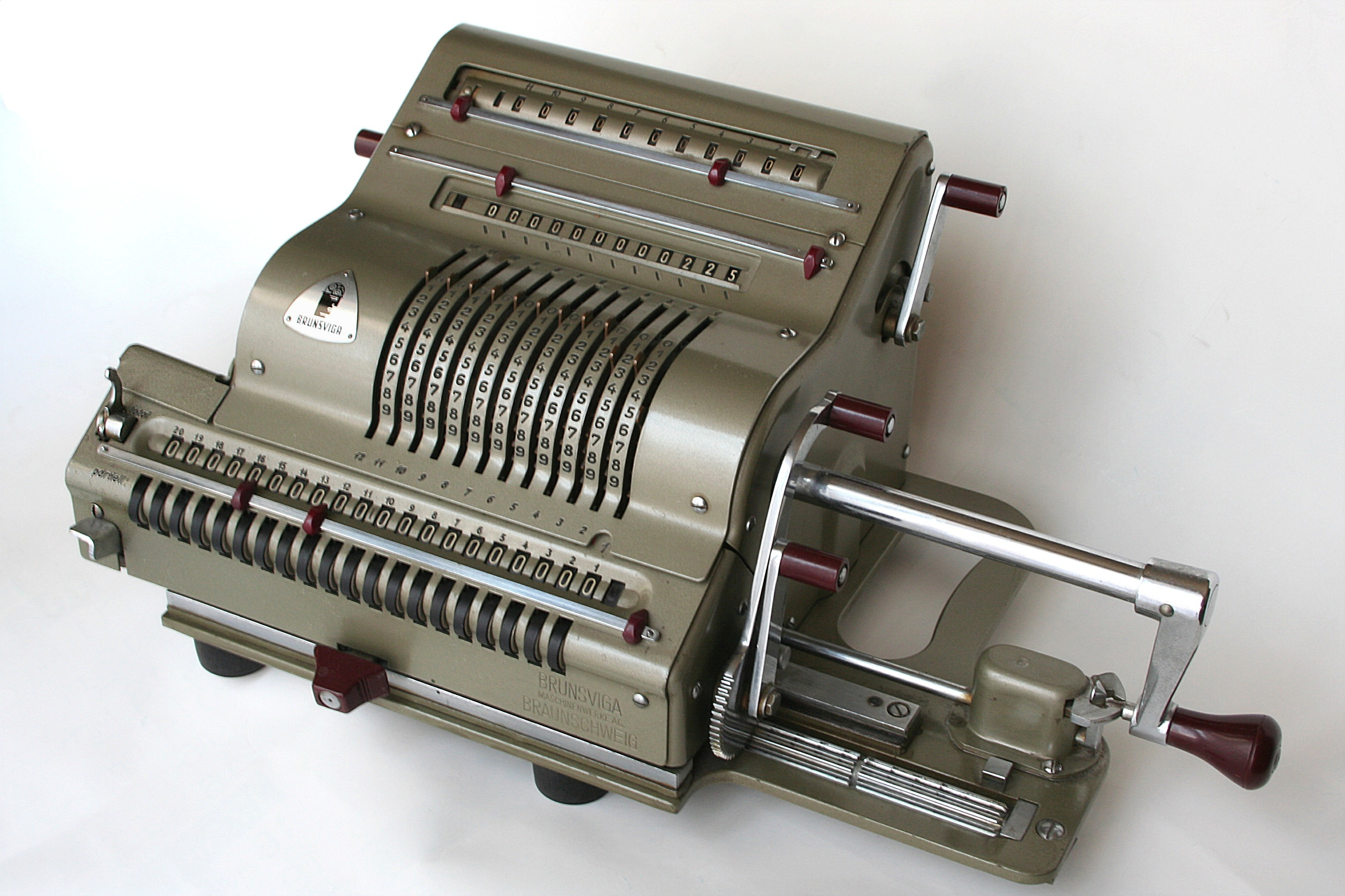
Brunsviga 20 adding machine manufactured by Olympia-Werke

As typewriters became increasingly popular in Germany in the early 20th century, the Allgemeine Elektricitäts-Gesellschaft (AEG) in Berlin commissioned Friedrich von Hefner-Alteneck, an electrical engineer, to develop such a device. Hefner-Alteneck then designed the Mignon, an inexpensive pointer typewriter that was not only affordable for larger companies, but also for craftsmen and private individuals. On 15 August 1903, Olympia-Werke was founded as the Union Schreibmaschinen-Gesellschaft m.b.H. to sell the Mignon. Beginning in 1930, the company traded as Europa Schreibmaschinen AG (transl. Europa Typewriters AG); internationally, the products were sold under the trademark Olympia. The last "Mignon" from 1933 was called the Olympia-Plurotyp. On 31 December 1936, the company's name was changed to Olympia Büromaschinenwerke AG (transl. Olympia Office Machine Works).

During World War II, the company produced a model of Enigma cipher machine. For reasons of secrecy, the Olympia-built machines bore no branding. Olympia's plant in Erfurt was severely damaged by U.S. artillery fire from 11 to 13 April 1945. After Erfurt was handed over to the Soviet occupying forces on 3 June 1945, the remaining operating facilities were nationalized, producing typewriters as VEB Optima Büromaschinenwerke.

== Post–World War II (1945–1954) ==
Olympia's factory in Wilhelmshaven came into being after World War II, when employees of the Erfurt factory fled to West Germany with their design documents and founded Bielefelder Schreibmaschinen Werke (transl. Bielefeld Typewriter Works) in Bielefeld. At the end of 1945, the board of directors of Bielefeld Schreibmaschinen Werke, while looking for more suitable production facilities and more qualified workers, came across the former naval equipment warehouse of the Kriegsmarine in Roffhausen. On 1 October 1946, the government of West Germany granted Bielefelder Schreibmaschinen a production permit. In its first year, the company's workforce consisted of 28 employees. Under difficult conditions, the production of typebar-based typewriters began, and soon after, amid high demand during the beginning of the West German economic miracle (Wirtschaftswunder), the company reached profitability. At the end of 1947, Bielefelder Schreibmaschinen changed its name to Orbis Schreibmaschinen-Werke (transl. Orbis Typewriter Works). The popular SM series of typewriters were introduced the following year.

In 1949, the International Court of Justice in The Hague had to judge whether the West or East German companies had the right to trade under the "Olympia" name. The court ultimately ruled in favor of the Wilhelmshaven company. The Erfurt plant then called itself Optima Büromaschinenwerk Erfurt and branded its products under the "Optima" name. Orbis Schreibmaschinen-Werke changed its name to Olympia-Werke West GmbH beginning in 1950; and in June 1954, the company finally changed its name to Olympia-Werke AG.

== Expansion (1954–1970) ==
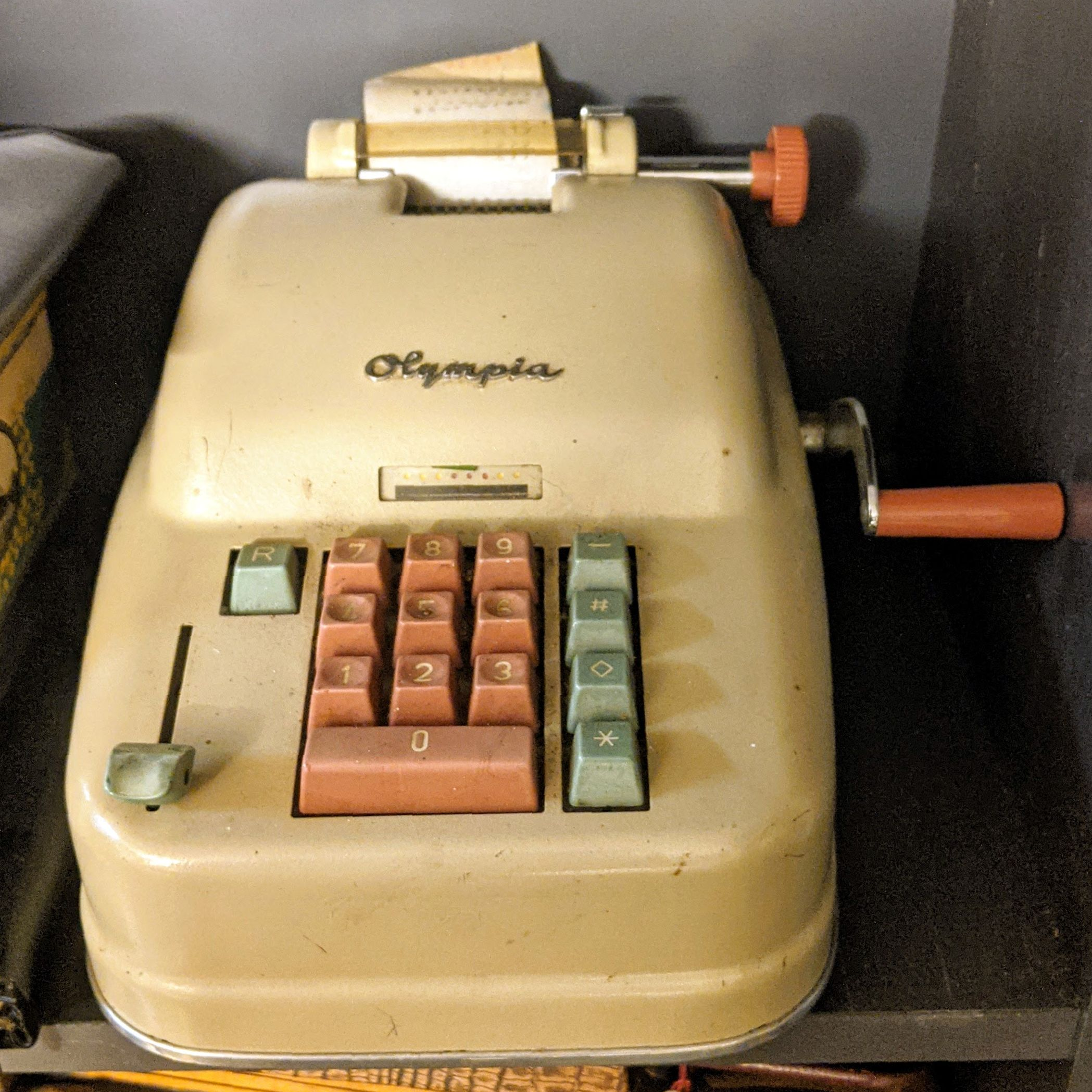
An Olympia mechanical calculator, c. 1950s

Olympia-Werke's profit and the workforce increased throughout the 1950s. In 1957, the company had a workforce of 12,000 employees. Factories and offices were raised throughout northwest Germany, acting as parts suppliers and supportive assembly lines for the main manufacturing facilities in the Roffhausen factory. In 1957 a new plant was built in Leer district (east of Friesland), which employed up to 2,500 people. Specialized portable typewriters were manufactured in this factory.

Acquisitions provided another avenue for Olympia-Werke's expansion during the Wirtschaftswunder. In 1957, Olympia-Werke took majority stake in the adding machine and cash register maker Brunsviga Maschinenwerke in Braunschweig. Two years later, Olympia-Werke acquired Brunsviga Maschinenwerke in its entirety. The manufacturing of Olympia cash registers was then relocated to Braunschweig. Focus turned to the development and manufacture of four-function adding machines, with the Brunsviga name kept alive for these machines.

In 1959, Roffhausen began production of electric typewriters, starting with the SGE models.

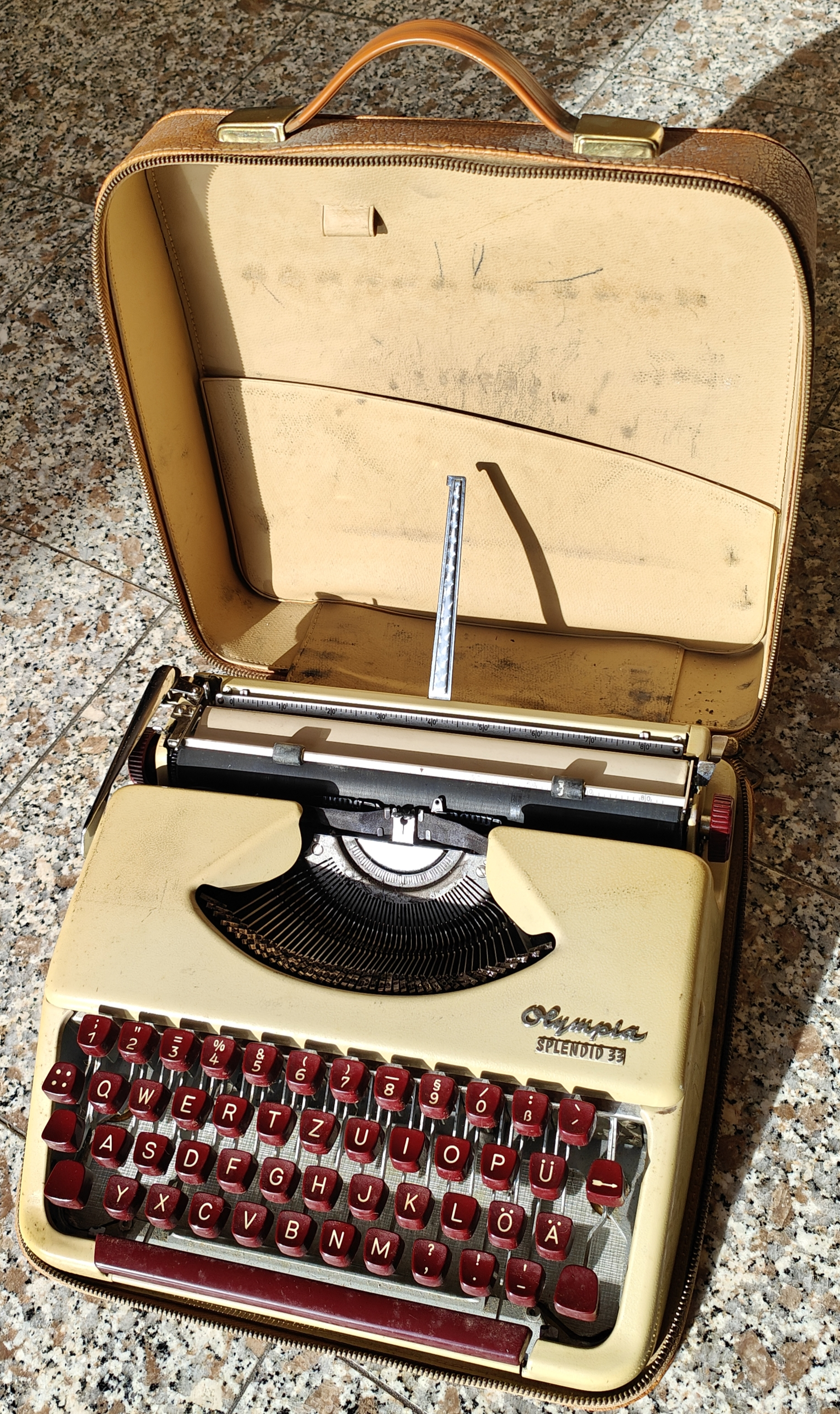
Olympia Splendid 33 typewriter year 1961

In 1961, every second typewriter produced in Germany came from Olympia. In 1962, AEG acquired further shares in Olympia-Werke and had come to own the entire share capital of Olympia-Werke, amounting to DM 55 million. In 1969, Olympia-Werke acquired typewriter maker Alpina Büromaschinen in Kaufbeuren. Three new production lines were built in Roffhausen, following an investment of around DM 10 million. By this point, Olympia had expanded production internationally: in addition to the plants in Roffhausen, Braunschweig, Leer, Norden, and Kaufbeuren, Olympia-Werke had production facilities in Belfast, Mexico City, Santiago, and Toronto. The total workforce peak at 20,000 employees in the beginning of 1969. Olympia was not only the number one German office equipment manufacturer; it was also one of the three largest office manufacturers in the world.

The inaugural CeBIT computer expo in 1970 marked another milestone in Olympia-Werke's history. By the end of the 1950s, office equipment manufacturing had become the third most profitable branch of industry among those who participated at the Hanover Fair, one of the world's largest trade fairs. Olympia was the largest exhibitor at the first CeBIT in 1970; there, they displayed the Olympia Multiplex 80 mainframe computer. Manufacture of the first unit of the Multiplex 80 was completed in 1969 for the Deutsche Bank in Hamburg. By 1976, seventy Multiplex 80s were installed in Germany, with a combined value of more than DE 10 million (equivalent to $19,243,659 in 2021). Distribution of these mainframes were handled by two different companies: Olympia delivered Multiplex 80s to financial institutions; while KME Group handled distribution for the commercial sectors (the computer's predominate use case).

== Decline (1970–1993) ==
From the mid-1960s, Olympia began manufacturing electronic calculators in addition to mechanical adding machines; these calculators displayed digits using Nixie tubes. By the end of the 1960s, however, these machines—fitted with hundreds of transistors and diodes—were already too heavy and too expensive for the average consumer, who were taking a preference to the Japanese-built calculators that were hitting the market. To gain market share, Olympia-Werke formed a joint venture with Matsushita (Panasonic) of Japan to manufacture Olympia calculators. Other components such as copiers were purchased from Agfa, among others. The slow but steady demise of traditional office equipment in favor of smaller minicomputers signaled the end of Olympia-Werke AG. AEG, which had been acquired by Daimler, was unable to provide any decisive innovative impetus.

Olympia-Werke's financial health continued to worsen in the mid-1980s. After a string of losses, AEG and Daimler-Benz decided in December 1991 to withdraw from the office equipment industry and to close the location with its workforce of around 3,600 employees. Under the motto "Olympia—the heart of the region must live on", a nationwide strike by Olympia employees to keep their jobs ensued, lasting for several months. With campaigns in Wilhelmshaven, Frankfurt, and Stuttgart, the responsibility of the Daimler-Benz group was reminded and public pressure was built up to create alternative jobs in the Wilhelmshaven–Friesland region. Despite this, the Roffhausen factory was ultimately shuttered in 1992. As a positive result of the labor dispute, Technologie-Centrum Nordwest (TCN; transl. Technology Center Northwest) was formed, which oversaw the spin-off and continuation of divisions of Olympia as independent companies and the establishment of new companies on TCN. The concept received support from the Lower Saxony government, union representatives, parent company Daimler-Benz, the district of Friesland, the city of Schortens. In the beginning of 1993, TCN had 14 companies with around 750 employees. In 2012, the newly formed Naval Support Command (Marineunterstützungskommando) moved into TCN's former premises.

Parts of AEG Olympia AG were turned into smaller, leaner companies. The first, Olympia Office Vertriebsgesellschaft mbH (transl. Olympia Office Sales Company) was established to lease and sell office machines (in practice, machines were mostly sold). Another, OSG Office Service GmbH offered brand-independent service contracts for all office machines on the market. Lastly, a holding company was established to lease factory real estate and production capital. It was not long before AEG Group sold off OSG Office Service GmbH and Olympia Office Vertriebsgesellschaft mbH. OSG Office Service GmbH found a new owner on 1 May 1993 in the form of Elcosa AG in Schaffhausen. Olympia Office Vertriebsgesellschaft mbH—along with its global sales network, its production facility in Mexico City, and the Olympia trademark which it owned—was taken over by the Hong Kong branch of Elitegroup Computer Systems on 1 July 1994; it continued as Olympia International Holdings Ltd, based in Road Town in the British Virgin Islands.

== Legacy ==
As in the case of RCA, today the Olympia brand survives in name only. In Germany, the trademark is owned by the entrepreneur Heinz Prygoda. As of 2022, Olympia International Holdings Ltd and Prygodas Olympia Business Systems Vertriebs GmbH also stock products under the Olympia name. At the beginning of 2019, Olympia Business Systems Vertriebs GmbH merged with the Wiesbaden-based office supplies wholesaler Genie GmbH & Co. KG (formerly Dieter Gerth GmbH), to form GO Europe GmbH, based in Hattingen. Olympia's website at https://www.olympia-vertrieb.de/ appears to be operational and working, with numerous products advertised, as well as it receiving a few Plus X awards in 2019 for the company's customer service and its Secure AS 302 alarm system.
