= Richard Thompson (Royal Navy officer) =

Royal Navy Vice Admiral (born 1966)

Vice Admiral Sir Richard Thompson KCB CBE FRS FRAeS
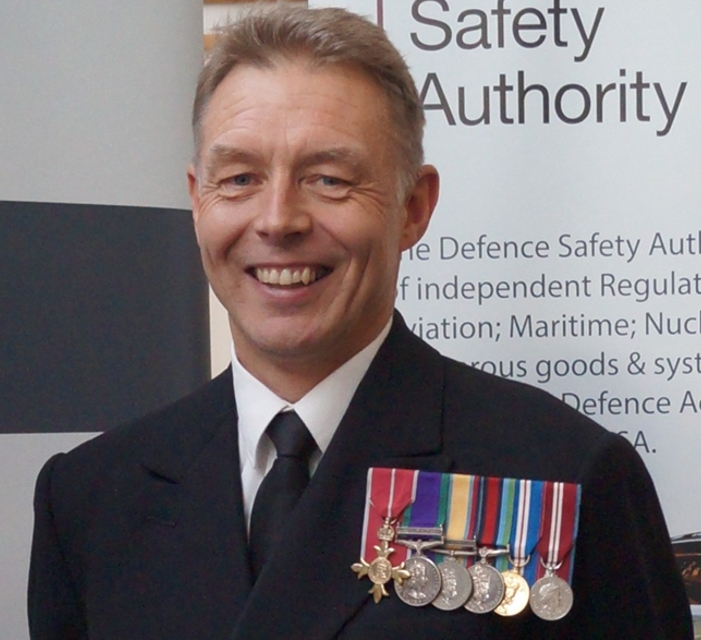
- Rear Admiral Thompson in 2016
- Born: 12 February 1966 (age 60)
- Alma mater: King's College London; Royal Naval Engineering College
- Military career
- Allegiance: United Kingdom
- Branch: Royal Navy
- Service years: 1985–2024
- Rank: Vice Admiral
- Conflicts: Gulf War; Sierra Leone Civil War
- Awards: Knight Commander of the Order of the Bath; Commander of the Order of the British Empire

Vice Admiral Sir Richard Charles Thompson, KCB, CBE, FRS, FRAeS (born 12 February 1966) is a retired Royal Navy officer.

== Early life and education ==
Thompson was born on 12 February 1966 in Reading, Berkshire, England. He was educated at Meadway School, a state school in Reading. He studied engineering at the Royal Naval Engineering College and King's College London.

== Naval career ==
Thompson joined the Royal Navy in 1985. He served with 845 Naval Air Squadron from 1989 to 1991, and with 849 Naval Air Squadron from 1991 to 1993. He served as Senior Air Engineer on the aircraft carrier HMS Ark Royal and went on to be team leader responsible for the procurement and integration of the Lightning II multirole combat aircraft. He was promoted to commodore on 27 July 2012.

Thompson became Director (Technical) at the Military Aviation Authority in October 2016. He was appointed Director General Air at Defence Equipment and Support and Air Member for Materiel on the Air Force Board in September 2020. He retired from the Royal Navy on 16 October 2024.

Thompson was appointed Officer of the Order of the British Empire (OBE) in the 2007 Birthday Honours, and Commander of the Order of the British Empire (CBE) in the 2014 New Year Honours. He was appointed Knight Commander of the Order of the Bath (KCB) in the 2023 Birthday Honours.

Military offices
Preceded by Julian Young	Chief of Materiel – Air, Defence Equipment and Support and Air Member for Materiel; 2020–present	Incumbent
