= Simon Bollom =

Retired RAF officer

Sir Simon Bollom
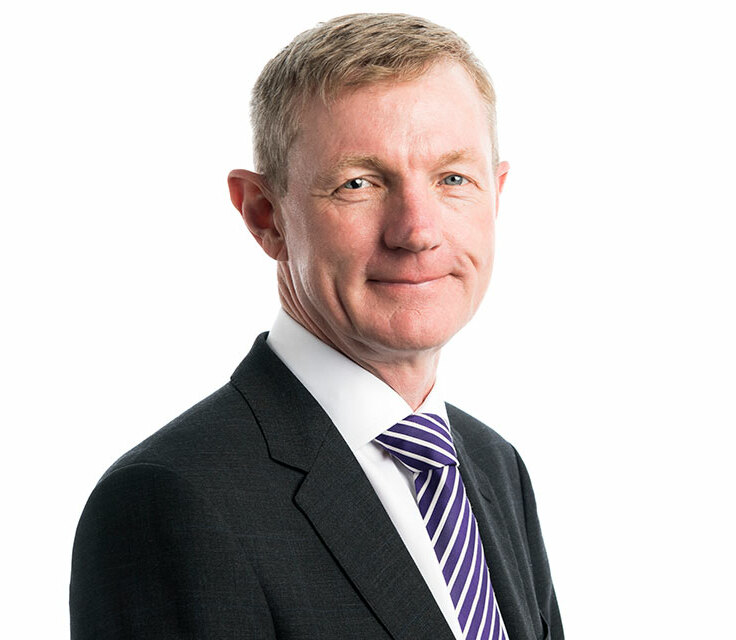
- Bollom in 2017
- Born: 1960 (age 65–66)
- Military career
- Allegiance: United Kingdom
- Branch: Royal Air Force
- Service years: 1981–2016
- Rank: Air Marshal
- Commands: Air Member for Materiel (2012–16)
- Conflicts: The Troubles
- Awards: Knight Commander of the Order of the British Empire; Companion of the Order of the Bath

Air Marshal Sir Simon John Bollom, KBE, CB, FREng (born 1960) is a retired senior Royal Air Force (RAF) officer. He also served as chief executive officer of Defence Equipment and Support from 2018 to 2022.

== RAF career ==
Educated at the University of Southampton, Bollom joined the RAF as an engineer in 1981. He became Director, Tactical Mobility at the Ministry of Defence in November 2000, Director Tornado Future Support at the Ministry of Defence in January 2003 and Tornado Integrated Project Team Leader in March 2005. He went on to be Director of Combat Air at Defence Equipment and Support in January 2008 and then Chief of Materiel – Air at Defence Equipment and Support in October 2012. He left the Royal Air Force in April 2016.

He was appointed Companion of the Order of the Bath (CB) in the 2011 Birthday Honours. In 2013, he was elected a Fellow of the Royal Academy of Engineering (FREng). He was appointed Knight Commander of the Order of the British Empire (KBE) in the 2016 New Year Honours.

== Post-RAF Career ==
In May 2017, he became the interim Chief of Materiel (Ships) at Defence Equipment and Support following the appointment of Vice Admiral Sir Simon Lister as acting CEO of the Submarine Delivery Agency. He became Chief Executive Officer of Defence Equipment and Support in May 2018. In 2021, he was paid a salary of £275,000 to £280,000 and a bonus of £95,000 to £100,000. In October 2023, he became National Chair of SSAFA, the Armed Forces charity.

Military offices
Preceded by Sir Kevin Leeson	Chief of Materiel – Air, Defence Equipment and Support and Air Member for Materiel; 2012–2016	Succeeded by Julian Young
Government offices
Preceded by Michael Bradley	CEO, Defence Equipment and Support; 2018–2022	Succeeded by Andy Start
