= Riyadh Air =

National airline of Saudi Arabia

Riyadh Air طيران الرياض

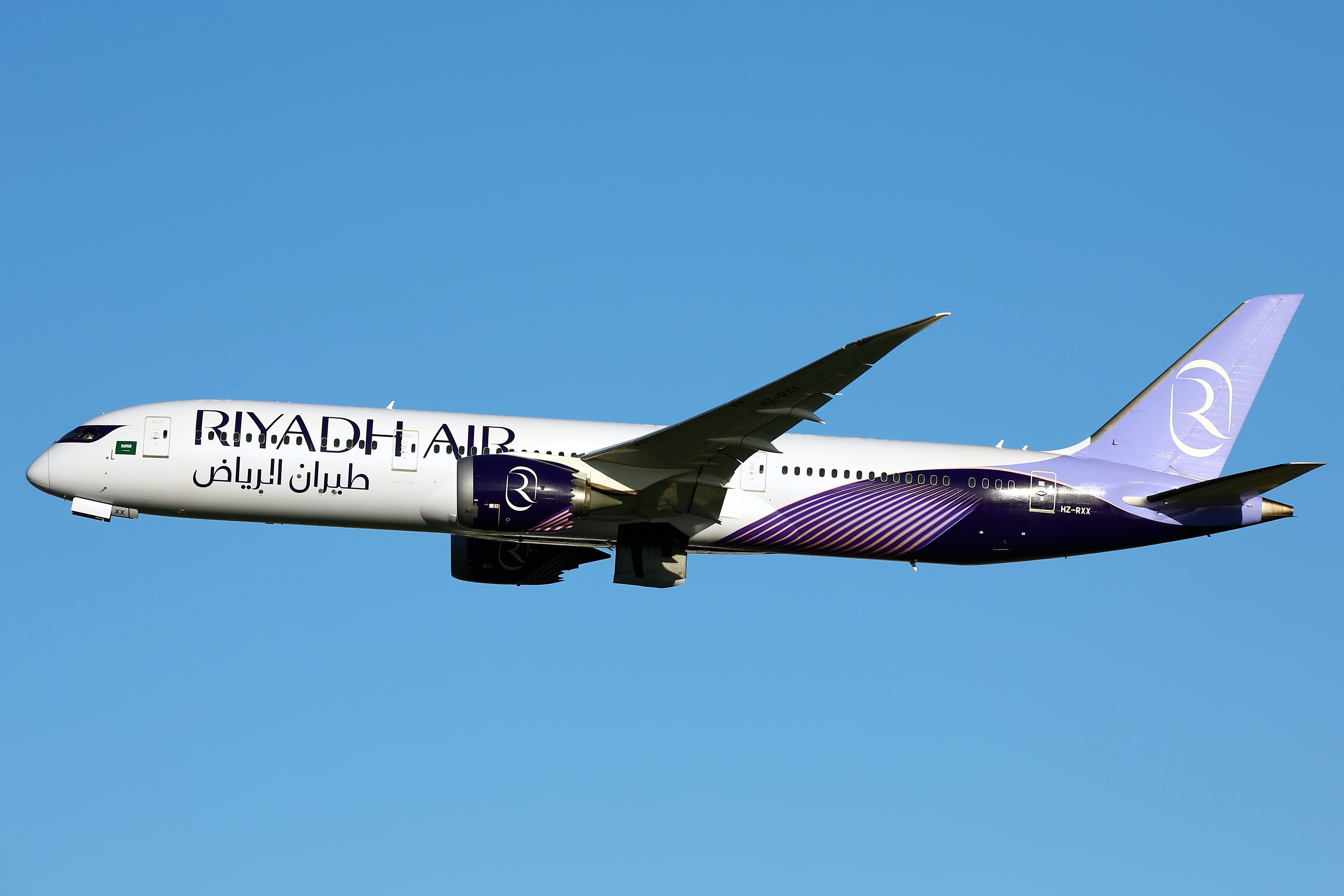
IATA	ICAO	Call sign
RX	RXI	RIYADH
- Founded: 12 March 2023; 3 years ago
- Commenced operations: 26 October 2025; 12 months ago
- Hubs: King Khalid International Airport Prince Naif bin Abdulaziz International Airport
- Frequent-flyer program: Sfeer
- Subsidiaries: Riyadh Cargo
- Fleet size: 8
- Destinations: 16
- Parent company: Public Investment Fund
- Headquarters: Riyadh, Saudi Arabia
- Key people: Yasir Al-Rumayyan (chairman); Tony Douglas (CEO)
- Website: www.riyadhair.com

Riyadh Air (Note: Arabic: طيران الرياض, romanized: Ṭayārān ar-Riyāḍ) is the second flag carrier of Saudi Arabia after Saudia, based in Riyadh. The airline's main hub is at King Khalid International Airport in Riyadh, and is aimed at the world market, operating domestic and internationally scheduled flights to over 100 destinations in six continents. The fleet will consist of 4 aircraft types, 60 Airbus A321neo, 31 Airbus A350-1000, 47 Boeing 787-9 Dreamliner, and 20 Boeing 787-10 Dreamliner aircraft, with options for more.

The airline operated its first commercial flight on 26 October 2025. It has cooperation agreements with SkyTeam members Delta Air Lines, China Eastern Airlines, Saudia, Air France-KLM, Air Europa, and Virgin Atlantic, and Star Alliance members Turkish Airlines, Singapore Airlines, Air China, All Nippon Airways (ANA), Air India, and EgyptAir.

According to the Saudi Press Agency (SPA), Riyadh Air will be owned by the country's Public Investment Fund (PIF), with Yasir Al-Rumayyan, the governor of PIF, as its chairman. Tony Douglas was appointed as its CEO. He was the CEO of Etihad Airways from January 2018 until October 2022. Riyadh Air is expected to add US$20 billion to non-oil GDP growth, and create more than 200,000 direct and indirect jobs.

== History ==
On 12 March 2023, the Crown Prince of Saudi Arabia, Mohammed bin Salman, formally announced the establishment of Riyadh Air, the country's newest national airline in Saudi Arabia. Two days later, it was announced that the airline had ordered 39 Boeing 787-9 aircraft with options for 33 more aircraft.

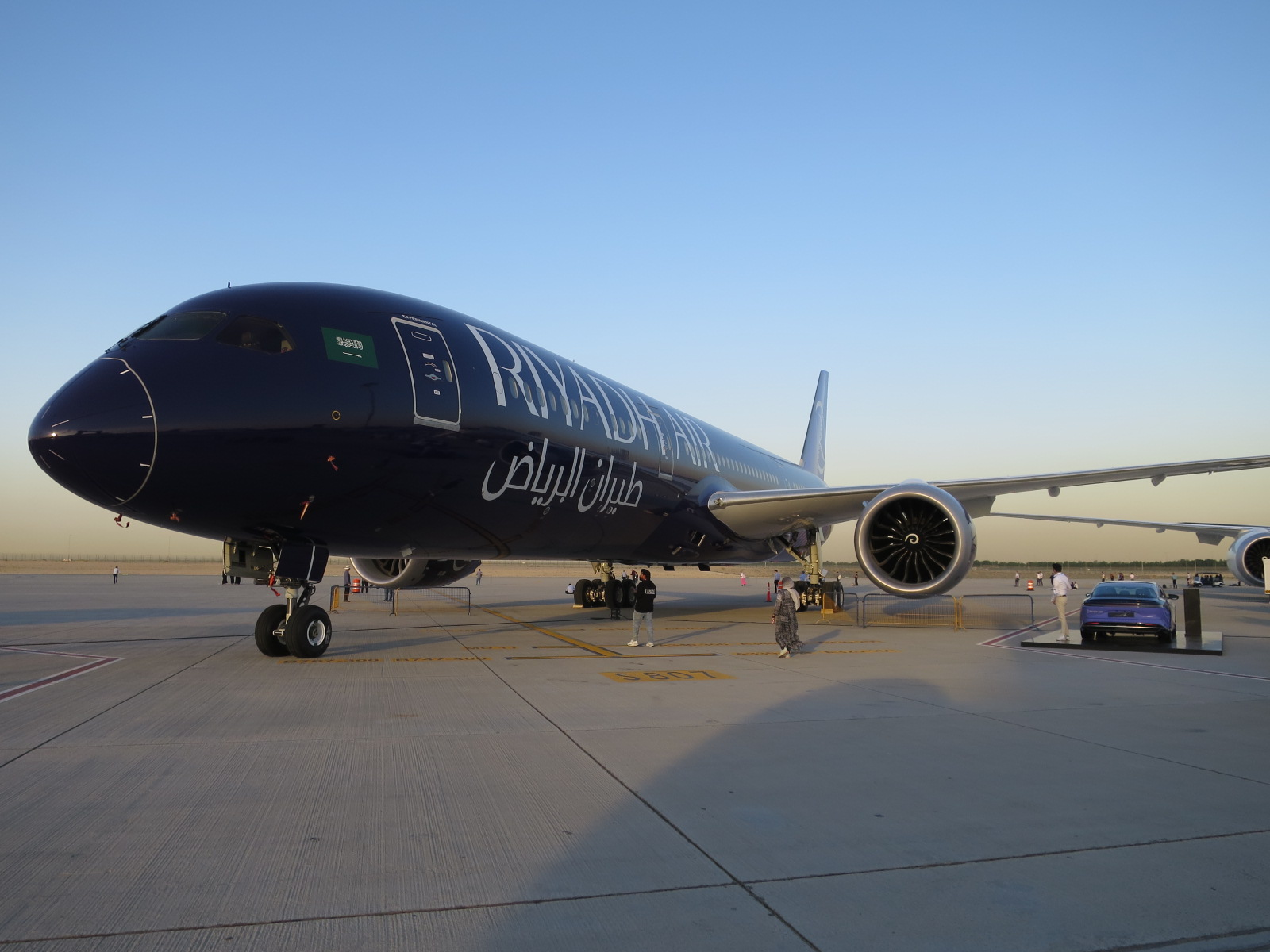
A Boeing 787-9 Dreamliner painted in the Riyadh Air livery at the Dubai Airshow 2023

Riyadh Air unveiled its first livery on 4 June 2023. The livery was painted on a Boeing 787-9, although this aircraft was owned by Boeing and will not enter the Riyadh Air fleet. On the same day, it received its airline designator code "RX" from the International Air Transport Association (IATA) at the World Air Transport Summit, which took place in Istanbul. On 12 June 2023, Boeing delivered the first aircraft to the airline's fleet. On 14 June 2023, the airline was granted its Passenger Air Transport Economic License by the General Authority of Civil Aviation (GACA), which is required for the airline to begin commercial operations. On 21 June 2023, at the Paris Air Show, Riyadh Air signed an agreement for 90 GE Aerospace's GEnx-1B engines to power its future fleet of 39 Boeing 787-9 aircraft.

On 9 July 2024, Riyadh Air signed a memorandum of understanding with Delta Air Lines, a founding member of SkyTeam alliance. Under the terms of the memorandum, the two airlines would establish a basis for future flight codesharing and alignment of the customer service and frequent-flier program experiences.

On 9 October 2024, Riyadh Air announced a partnership with FLYR. FLYR will deliver its Offer and Order retailing platform to power Riyadh Air's commercial operations, making it the world's first native ONE Order network carrier.

On 30 October 2024, Riyadh Air confirmed an order of 60 Airbus A321neo.

On 15 January 2025, Riyadh Air received its first Boeing 787-9 aircraft, however it is leased, and it will be used only as a technical spare and training aircraft.

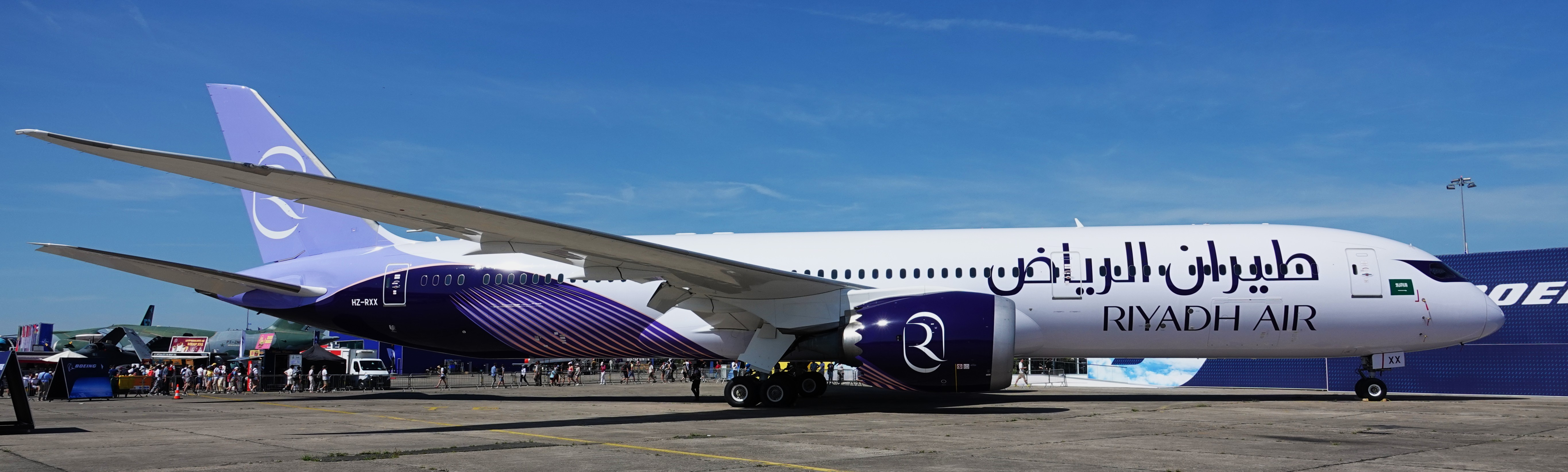
A Boeing 787-9 Dreamliner painted in the airline’s second white livery at the Paris Air Show 2025

On 6 April 2025, Riyadh Air received approval from the General Authority of Civil Aviation (GACA) to commence its flight operations.

On 16 June 2025, Riyadh Air announced the order of 25 Airbus A350-1000 aircraft at the Paris Air Show. The deal also includes purchase rights for an additional 25 of the type.

On 7 August 2025, Riyadh Air announced a partnership with Amadeus. Amadeus will distribute Riyadh Air’s future NDC (New Distribution Capability) content, allowing for personalized offers and dynamic pricing across third-party platforms.

On 21 January 2026, Riyadh Air announced the establishment of Riyadh Cargo.

On 5 June 2026, the first two factory-new aircraft of the airline were delivered.

On 23 July 2026, Riyadh Air announced the launch of RX Pay, a co-branded Mastercard payment card program that rewards Sfeer Points with everyday purchases.

On 25 October 2026, Riyadh Air moved selected operations to Prince Naif bin Abdulaziz International Airport due to Houthis attacks on Riyadh Air's original hub, King Khalid International Airport.

== Sponsorships ==
Riyadh Air has primarily sponsored association football teams. 2023 saw Riyadh Air become the shirt sponsor of Atlético Madrid. The following year, Riyadh Air sponsored CONCACAF, the association football confederation of North America, becoming the official airline of the conference. Later that year, Riyadh Air purchased the naming rights to Metropolitano Stadium, the home field for Atlético Madrid.

== Destinations ==
Riyadh Air aims to operate to 100 destinations by 2030. As of 6 June 2026, the airline has announced a preliminary route network to London Heathrow, Dubai International, Madrid–Barajas Airport, Cairo International Airport, Manchester Airport, and Jeddah Airport, with plans to announce more destinations soon after as aircraft deliveries ramp up. Public ticket sales opened on 19 May for flights aboard their newly acquired aircraft, with plans to begin scheduled service to London Heathrow on 1 July (later brought forward to 10 June). The airline originally operated this service on a Boeing 787-9 leased from Oman Air with the name Jamila (Note: Arabic: جميلة, romanized: Jamīla, lit. 'beautiful') prior to their official launch.

In June 2026, they announced plans to operate three new flights to Dhaka, Kuala Lumpur and Málaga. Later in September 2026 they announced the addition of a Milan service.

Country	City	Airport	Notes	Refs
Bangladesh	Dhaka	Hazrat Shahjalal International Airport	Passenger	
Egypt	Cairo	Cairo International Airport	Passenger	
India	Mumbai	Chhatrapati Shivaji Maharaj International Airport	Passenger	
Indonesia	Jakarta	Soekarno–Hatta International Airport	Begins 16 November 2026	
Italy	Milan	Milan Malpensa Airport	Begins 16 December 2026	
Malaysia	Kuala Lumpur	Kuala Lumpur International Airport	Passenger	
Pakistan	Islamabad	Islamabad International Airport	Passenger	
Pakistan	Lahore	Allama Iqbal International Airport	Passenger	
Philippines	Manila	Ninoy Aquino International Airport	Passenger	
Saudi Arabia	Buraydah	Prince Naif bin Abdulaziz International Airport	Hub	
Saudi Arabia	Jeddah	King Abdulaziz International Airport	Passenger	
Saudi Arabia	Riyadh	King Khalid International Airport	Hub	
Spain	Madrid	Madrid–Barajas Airport	Passenger	
Spain	Málaga	Málaga Airport	Passenger	
Thailand	Bangkok	Suvarnabhumi Airport	Passenger	
United Arab Emirates	Dubai	Dubai International Airport	Passenger	
United Kingdom	London	Heathrow Airport	Passenger	
United Kingdom	Manchester	Manchester Airport	Passenger	

=== Codeshare and cargo SPA agreements ===
==== Codeshare agreements ====
Riyadh Air has also unveiled codeshare agreements with the following airlines:

- Air China
- Air France–KLM
- Air Europa
- Air India
- All Nippon Airways (ANA)
- China Eastern Airlines
- Delta Air Lines
- EgyptAir
- Saudia
- Singapore Airlines
- Turkish Airlines
- Virgin Atlantic

==== Cargo SPA agreements ====
- Pakistan International Airlines

== Fleet ==
As of September 2026, Riyadh Air operates the following aircraft:

Riyadh Air fleet
Aircraft	In service	Orders	Passengers					Notes
Aircraft	In service	Orders	F	J	W	Y	Total	Notes
Airbus A321neo	—	60	TBA					
Airbus A350-1000	—	31	TBA					Order with 19 options.
Boeing 787-9	7	40	4	24	39	223	290	Order with 5 options.
Boeing 787-9	1	—	—				288	Leased from Oman Air to be used only as a technical spare and training aircraft.
Boeing 787-10	—	20	TBA					
Total	8	151						

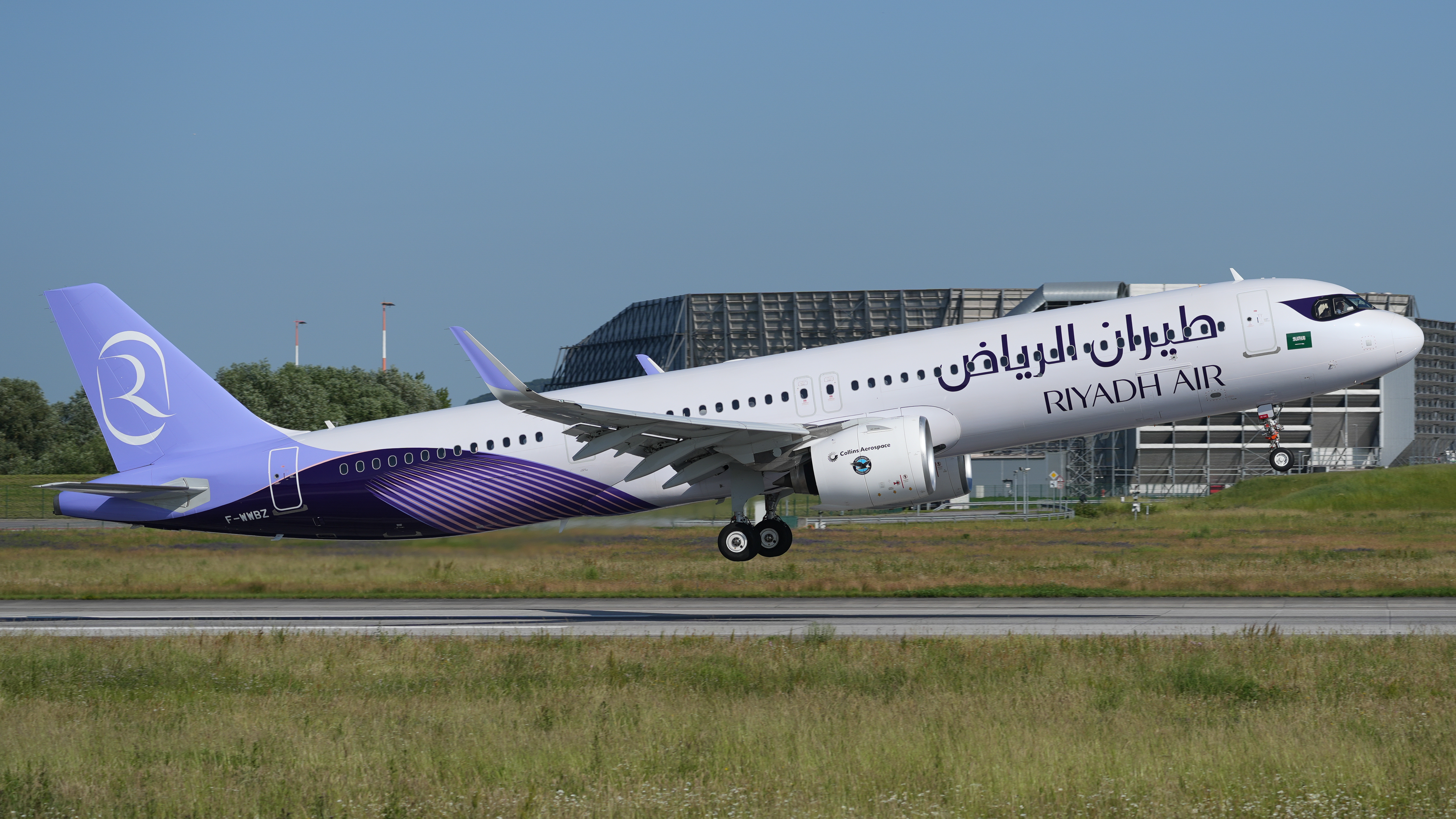
An Airbus A321XLR testbed painted in the Riyadh Air livery

== See also ==
- List of airlines of Saudi Arabia
- List of airports in Saudi Arabia
- List of Saudi Vision 2030 projects
