= Yasir Al-Rumayyan =

Saudi businessman (born 1970)

- ياسر الرميان
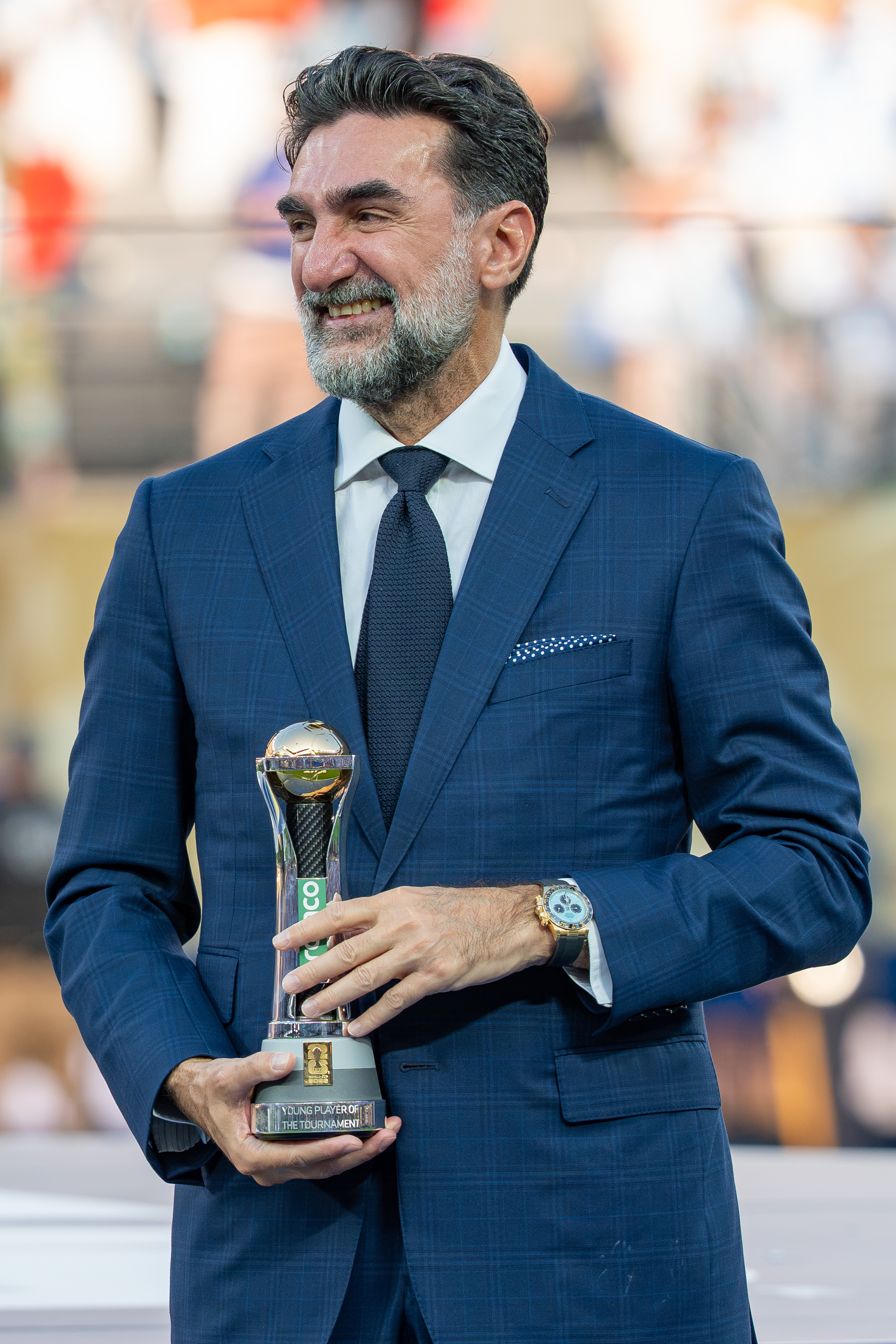
- Al-Rumayyan in 2026

Chairman of Newcastle United F.C.
- Incumbent
- Assumed office 19 November 2021
- Co-owners: Amanda Staveley (2021–2024); RB Sports & Media (2021–)
- Head coaches: Steve Bruce (2021); Eddie Howe (2021–26); Matthias Jaissle (2026-)
- Preceded by: Lee Charnley

Governor of Saudi Arabia's Public Investment Fund
- Incumbent
- Assumed office September 2015

Personal details
- Born: Yasir bin Othman Al-Rumayyan; 18 February 1970 (age 56) Buraidah, Saudi Arabia
- Education: King Faisal University
- Occupation: Businessman

Yasir bin Othman Al-Rumayyan (Arabic: ياسر الرميان; born 18 February 1970) is a Saudi Arabian businessman who is governor of the Public Investment Fund (PIF), the sovereign wealth fund of the Kingdom of Saudi Arabia. He also chairs the state-owned petroleum company Saudi Aramco and Saudi Arabia's largest mining company Ma'aden.

He is chairman of the English football club Newcastle United, the airline Riyadh Air, and managed the LIV Golf professional men's golf tour. He is also involved in the construction of Neom, a controversial megaproject.

Al-Rumayyan is a close ally of Saudi ruler Mohammed bin Salman. His early career was in finance. When King Abdullah died in 2015 and power consolidated around Crown Prince Mohammed bin Salman, Al-Rumayyan was appointed chairman of PIF and placed on the board of Saudi Aramco. After Bin Salman's 2017 purge of competing Saudi political elites, Al-Rumayyan and his associates assisted Bin Salman in consolidating his authority, while the sovereign fund acquired assets seized from prominent Saudi figures.

== Early life and education ==
Yasir Al-Rumayyan was born in Buraidah, Al-Qassim Province, in 1970. His parents were both from Saudi Arabia. He moved to Riyadh as a child, where he attended Al-Abna'a.

He graduated from King Faisal University in Alahsa in 1993 with a degree in accounting. He did a three-month course at Harvard Business School in 2007.

== Career ==
He began his career at Saudi Hollandi Bank, becoming head of international brokerage before joining the Capital Markets Authority (CMA), where he was head of securities listings. Between 2011 and 2015, Al-Rumayyan was CEO of Saudi Fransi Capital (SFC), the investment banking arm of Banque Saudi Fransi. From 2014 to 2015 he was on the board of directors of the Saudi Stock Exchange.

Al-Rumayyan sits on the boards of SoftBank Group and Reliance Industries Ltd.

Al-Rumayyan was made chairman of the Saudi Aramco board in September 2019 after Crown Prince Bin Salman stripped Khalid Al-Falih, the energy minister, of his duties when he questioned Bin Salman's directives.

=== Public Investment Fund ===
In September 2015, Al-Rumayyan was appointed managing director of the Public Investment Fund of Saudi Arabia (PIF).

In 2016, PIF invested $3.5 billion in the US-based Uber. He joined Uber's board of directors as part of the agreement.

In August 2016, Al-Rumayyan joined the board of the state oil company Saudi Aramco as part of a move toward closer cooperation between Aramco and PIF in restructuring the Saudi economy. In October that year, PIF invested $45 billion in the newly established SoftBank Vision Fund. In May 2017, PIF invested $20 billion to a joint US infrastructure fund with Blackstone.

Al-Rumayyan was involved in the transfer of assets to PIF in the wake of the Saudi Arabian government's 2017 purge. He transferred 20 companies that had been seized by the government into the PIF, including one later alleged to be used by Saudi operatives in the murder of journalist Jamal Khashoggi.

In October 2021, PIF announced that the acquisition of Newcastle United by the consortium consisting of the Public Investment Fund and that Al-Rumayyan would be elected as chairman of the club after PIF acquired it.

== Personal life ==
He has at least one son.

Bin Salman gave Al-Rumayyan a house worth 250 million Saudi riyals (over $60m) near the presidential palace.

He has been described as passionate about golfing. After Bin Salman's purge of other Saudi political elites, Al-Rumayyan's brother-in-law, Mazin bin Ibrahim Al-Kahmous, was made president of Saudi Arabia's Oversight and Anti-Corruption Authority.

He is close with Donald Trump and has been photographed wearing a ‘Make America Great Again’ hat. After Trump's win in the 2024 election, he was spotted at a UFC event in Madison Square Garden with the president-elect.
