= Royal Naval Supply and Transport Service =

Former agency in the United Kingdom

- Flag of the Royal Naval Supply and Transport Service (1984-1996)

Agency overview
- Formed: (1965-1994)
- Preceding agency: Naval Stores Department
- Superseding agency: Naval Bases and Supply Agency
- Jurisdiction: United Kingdom
- Headquarters: London
- Agency executive: Director General Supply and Transport (Navy)
- Parent agency: Ministry of Defence

The Royal Naval Supply and Transport Service, or RNSTS, was the civilian crewed logistics service that supported the British Royal Navy and Royal Fleet Auxiliary (RFA); being part of the MOD (Navy). It was formed in 1965 and was abolished in 1994, its role (excluding the Royal Fleet Auxiliary) being taken over by the Naval Bases and Supply Agency.

== Responsibilities ==
The RNSTS was responsible for the maintenance, distribution and clerical oversight of all forms of stores between depot and ship. This included:

- General Naval Stores
- Electronic Stores (including radar, sonar, electronic warfare and communications equipment)
- Armaments
- Victuals
- Fuel
- Motor Transport

Some RNSTS personnel served at sea on RFA replenishment ships. During the Falklands War the RNSTS was responsible for supplying the task force, as well as pressing over 50 commercial ships such as the Queen Elizabeth 2 into military service (known as STUFT, or Ships Taken Up From Trade).

The head of the RNSTS was the Director General Supply and Transport (Navy), or DGST(N). On 21 October 1982, following the conclusion of the Falklands operation, Sir Frank Cooper, PUS, sent a message to DGST(N) including

"...I would like you to convey to all members of the RNSTS, including the RFA,...my sincere appreciation of their considerable efforts. I know my appreciation is shared wholeheartedly by other members of the Defence Council. Without the sterling work of the RNSTS, the successful outcome of the Falklands campaign might well have been jeopardised. The tasks that fell to them were undertaken with a vigour, dedication and willingness which deserves the highest praise. I should like formally to commend the whole of the RNSTS, including the RFA, and to send congratulations and thanks to everyone involved."

After some 30 years in being (it was formed from the separate Directorates of Stores, Victualling, Armament Supply and Movements in 1965) the RNSTS ceased to be on absorption into the Naval Bases and Supply Agency (part of the Naval Support Command) on 1 April 1994.

== See also ==
- Royal Naval Armaments Depot
- Victualling Commissioners
- Transport Board (Royal Navy)
