= Blue fleet (Canada) =

The Blue fleet refers to civilian vehicles held by the Canadian Department of National Defence and the Canadian Forces which may or may not be taken off-road.

== Canadian Forces Reserves ==
Most of these vehicles are for re-cruitment or transport within Canada.

Model	Type	Number	Dates	Builder	Details
MCI J4500	bus	2+?	?	Motor Coach Industries, Canada
MCI-9	bus	6+	?	Motor Coach Industries, Canada
Ford Transit Van	Van	?	?	Ford, Canada
Ford Super Duty	Truck	?	?	Ford, Canada

== Canadian Forces Military Police ==
These vehicles are used on Canadian Forces bases and all are in Canada.

Model	Type	Number	Dates	Builder	Details
Ford Crown Victoria	cruiser		2008	Ford
Chevrolet Impala	cruiser		2006	Chevrolet
Ford Explorer	SUV cruiser		2008	Ford
Chevrolet Tahoe	SUV cruiser		2008	Chevrolet
Chevrolet Silverado	Pick Up		2008	Chevrolet

== See also ==
- Green fleet
- White fleet
