= Colin Terry =

Royal Air Force officer (1943–2025)

Sir Colin Terry
- Born: 8 August 1943
- Died: 9 February 2025 (aged 81)
- Military career
- Allegiance: United Kingdom
- Branch: Royal Air Force
- Service years: 1965–1999
- Rank: Air Marshal
- Commands: Logistics Command (1997–99)
- Awards: Knight Commander of the Order of the British Empire; Companion of the Order of the Bath

Air Marshal Sir Colin George Terry, KBE, CB, DL, FREng (8 August 1943 – 9 February 2025) was a senior Royal Air Force officer.

== RAF career ==
Educated at Imperial College London, Terry joined the Royal Air Force in 1965. He went on to be Director-General of Support Management in 1993, Chief of Staff at Logistics Command in 1995 and Air Officer Commanding-in-Chief at Logistics Command in 1997 before retiring in 1999. He was appointed a Knight Commander of the Order of the British Empire in the 1995 Birthday Honours.

== Later life and career ==
In retirement Terry became President of the Council of the Royal Aeronautical Society and Chairman of the Engineering Council. He also became Chairman of Meggitt and deputy lieutenant of Buckinghamshire. He was also appointed a Fellow of the Royal Academy of Engineering in 2001.

Terry was chairman of Centronic, a nuclear industry engineering company, between July 2016 and July 2018.

Terry was appointed Chairman of BOXARR, a software business, in 2017.

Terry died on 9 February 2025.

Military offices
Preceded by Sir John Allison	Air Officer Commanding-in-Chief Logistics Command; 1997–1999	Succeeded by Sir Malcolm Pledger
