= Malcolm Pledger =

Sir Malcolm Pledger
- Born: 24 July 1948 (age 78); Littleborough, Lancashire, England
- Military career
- Allegiance: United Kingdom
- Branch: Royal Air Force
- Service years: 1966–2005
- Rank: Air Chief Marshal
- Commands: Logistics Command; RAF Shawbury; No. 28 Squadron; No. 240 Operational Conversion Unit; No. 28 Squadron
- Conflicts: Falklands War
- Awards: Knight Commander of the Order of the Bath; Officer of the Order of the British Empire; Air Force Cross

Air Chief Marshal Sir Malcolm David Pledger, KCB, OBE, AFC (born 24 July 1948) is a retired Royal Air Force officer.

== RAF career ==
Pledger was educated at Heywood Grammar School (became part of a comprehensive in 1968 and is now Siddal Moor Sports College) and Newcastle University, where he read chemistry. Pledger then attended the RAF College, Cranwell where he completed his initial officer training. After basic flying training Pledger's flying career was on helicopters. He was appointed Officer Commanding No. 28 Squadron in 1978 and then commanded No. 240 Operational Conversion Unit before taking part in the Falklands War and commanding No. 28 Squadron. He became Station Commander of RAF Shawbury in 1990 before being appointed Air Officer Plans at Headquarters Strike Command in 1994. He went on to be Chief of Staff at Logistics Command in 1997, Air Officer Commanding-in-Chief at Logistics Command in April 1999 and Deputy Chief of the Defence Staff (Personnel) in September 1999. He was Chief of Defence Logistics from 2002 to 2005.

== Family ==
He married Betty Kershaw; they have two sons.

Military offices
Preceded by Sir Colin Terry	Air Officer Commanding-in-Chief Logistics Command; 1999	Succeeded by Graham Skinner
Preceded by Sir Jeremy Blackham	Deputy Chief of the Defence Staff (Personnel); 1999–2002	Succeeded by Anthony Palmer
Preceded by Sir Samuel Cowan	Chief of Defence Logistics; 2002–2005	Succeeded by Sir Kevin O'Donoghue
