= Graham Skinner =

- Born: 1945 (age 80–81)
- Military career
- Allegiance: United Kingdom
- Branch: Royal Air Force
- Service years: 1963–2000
- Rank: Air vice-marshal
- Commands: Logistics Command (1999)
- Conflicts: Gulf War
- Awards: Commander of the Order of the British Empire

Air Vice Marshal Graham Skinner, CBE (born 1945) is a retired Royal Air Force officer.

== RAF career ==
Educated at Hampton School, the University of Bristol and Loughborough University, Skinner joined the Royal Air Force in 1963. He served at Strike Command during the Gulf War and went on to be Director of Logistics Policy and then Director of in-service support for the Tornado and Typhoon programmes before becoming Commander-in-Chief of Logistics Command in September 1999. He left the post in October 1999 on the disbandment of the command. In retirement he became Clerk of the Worshipful Company of Engineers.

== Family ==
In 1969 Skinner married Margaret; they have a son and a daughter.

Military offices
Preceded by Sir Malcolm Pledger	Air Officer Commanding-in-Chief Logistics Command; 1999	Post disbanded
