= Michael Alcock =

Royal Air Force Air Chief Marshal (1936–present)

Air Chief Marshal Sir Michael Alcock GCB KBE FREng FIMechE FRAeS
- Born: 11 July 1936 (age 90)
- Military career
- Allegiance: United Kingdom
- Branch: Royal Air Force
- Service years: 1959–96
- Rank: Air Chief Marshal
- Commands: Logistics Command (1994–96)
- Awards: Knight Grand Cross of the Order of the Bath; Knight Commander of the Order of the British Empire
- Other work: Aerospace consultant

Air Chief Marshal Sir Robert James Michael Alcock (born 11 July 1936) usually referred to as Sir Michael Alcock, is a retired senior Royal Air Force commander and an aerospace consultant.

== RAF career ==
Educated at Victoria College, Jersey, Alcock was commissioned in the Technical Branch of the Royal Air Force in 1959.

By the time of the Gulf War, Alcock was air officer engineering at Headquarters Strike Command. He was appointed the RAF's chief engineer in 1991, and promoted to air chief marshal in 1993. The following year Alcock graduated from Cranfield University before being appointed air officer commanding-in-chief the newly established Logistics Command on 1 April 1994. The role also carried with it a seat on the Air Force Board as the air member for logistics and Alcock became the first non-aircrew officer to sit on the Air Force Board. Additionally, Alcock continued to be designated as the RAF's Chief Engineer. Alcock was succeeded by Sir John Allison on 8 March 1996. He retired from the RAF on 25 June 1996, and subsequently worked as an aerospace consultant.

Military offices
New title Command formed from part of the responsibilities of Support Command	Air Officer Commanding-in-Chief Logistics Command; 1994–1996	Succeeded by Sir John Allison
