= Kevin O'Donoghue =

British Army general (born 1947)

General Sir Kevin O'Donoghue KCB CBE
- Born: 9 December 1947 (age 78)
- Military career
- Allegiance: United Kingdom
- Branch: British Army
- Service years: 1968–2011
- Rank: General
- Service number: 486538
- Commands: Chief of Defence Materiel; 25 Engineer Regiment
- Conflicts: The Troubles
- Awards: Knight Commander of the Order of the Bath; Commander of the Order of the British Empire

General Sir Kevin O'Donoghue, KCB, CBE (born 9 December 1947) is a retired British Army officer and former Chief of Defence Materiel. He retired from the service in December 2010, being succeeded as Chief of Defence Materiel by Bernard Gray.

== Early life ==
O'Donoghue was born on 9 December 1947, to Phillip James O'Donoghue and Winifred Mary O'Donoghue. He studied at University of Manchester Institute of Science and Technology. He graduated in 1971 with a first-class Bachelor of Science.

== Military career ==
O'Donoghue joined the Territorial Army in 1968. He was commissioned in the Royal Engineers as a second lieutenant (on probation) on 10 October 1968. He was attending university and had previously been an officer cadet. In 1971, after approximately two years as a troop commander in 75 Engineer Regiment, he converted to a Regular Commission and spent the next 5 years in the British Army of the Rhine.

In 1976, O'Donoghue moved to the Royal Military Academy Sandhurst as an instructor. He then attended the Canadian Forces' Command and staff Course in Toronto before being posted to the Ministry of Defence as Military Assistant to the Chief of the General staff.

O'Donoghue returned to Germany as Officer Commanding 4 Field Squadron RE (21 Engineer Regiment) in support of 7th Armoured Brigade. During this time he was instrumental in the development and introduction of the mini minefield defence concept. On promotion he returned to the UK and became a member of the Directing staff for the Army staff Course. Command of 25 Engineer Regiment included a deployment to the Falkland Islands. He then attended the Higher Command and Staff Course in 1990 and was promoted to brigadier and assumed the appointment of Commander Corps Royal Engineers 1 (British) Corps (which became Chief Engineer Allied Command Europe Rapid Reaction Corps) and Commander Hameln Garrison.

In 1993 O'Donoghue attended the NATO Defence College in Rome, before moving to Supreme Headquarters Allied Powers Europe to become the Director of staff Operations. He was promoted to major general in April 1996 on appointment as Chief of staff, Headquarters Quartermaster General, following which he moved to the Ministry of Defence to become the Assistant Chief of the General staff.

O'Donoghue was promoted to lieutenant general and became the UK Military Representative to NATO, the EU and WEU. He then served as Deputy Chief of the Defence staff (Health), responsible for the Defence Medical Services, from 2002 to 2004. On 10 May 2004, he was appointed to the honorary role of Chief Royal Engineer. His tenure ended on 10 May 2009.

O'Donoghue was appointed a Knight Commander of the Order of the Bath in the 2005 New Year Honours, and became Chief of Defence Logistics on 1 January. When the Defence Logistics Organisation merged with the Defence Procurement Agency on 2 April 2007, he became the first Chief of Defence Materiel. He was appointed Honorary Colonel Commandant of the Royal Logistic Corps on 1 February 2007, and to the honorary role of Master General of Logistics on 1 June 2009. He was the first to hold this appointment. His tenured ended on 1 June 2012.

O'Donoghue relinquished the post of Chief of Defence Materiel in December 2010, and officially retired from the British Army on 19 March 2011.

== Later life ==
From 2010 to 2017, O'Donoghue was Chairman of SSAFA. He has served as the Gentleman Usher to the Sword of State, an officer of the Royal Household, since 2013.

== Personal life ==
O'Donoghue has a wife named Jean and together they have three daughters. His hobbies include dog walking, reading military history and gardening.

Military offices
Preceded by Michael Willcocks	Assistant Chief of the General staff 1999–2001	Succeeded by Richard Dannatt
Preceded by Sir Michael Willcocks	UK Military Representative to NATO; 2001–2002	Succeeded by Sir Robert Wright
Preceded by Sir Malcolm Pledger	Chief of Defence Logistics; 2005–2007	Succeeded by Himself; As Chief of Defence Materiel
Preceded by Sir Peter Spencer; As Chief of Defence Procurement	Chief of Defence Materiel; 2007–2010	Succeeded by Bernard Gray
Preceded by Himself; As Chief of Defence Logistics	Chief of Defence Materiel; 2007–2010	Succeeded by Bernard Gray
Honorary titles
Preceded by Sir Scott Grant	Chief Royal Engineer; 2004–2009	Succeeded by Sir Peter Wall
New title	Master General of Logistics; 2009–2012	Succeeded by Mark Poffley
