= White fleet =

White Fleet or White fleet may refer to:

- White fleet (military vehicles), non-combat vehicles used by Australian, New Zealand, and UK military forces
- The Great White Fleet, the dispatch of US naval forces to the orient between 1907 and 1909
- White Fleet, the fleet of Portuguese fishing vessels that fished for cod on Newfoundland's Grand Banks (e.g. UAM Creoula)
