= Chief Executive Officer of Defence Equipment and Support =

Senior post in the United Kingdom Ministry of Defence

The Chief Executive Officer of Defence Equipment and Support, formerly the Chief of Defence Materiel, is a senior post in the UK Ministry of Defence created in April 2007. It merges the roles of Chief of Defence Procurement and Chief of Defence Logistics into a single post responsible for leading Defence Equipment and Support.

== Postholders ==
Chief of Defence Materiel

- General Sir Kevin O'Donoghue: 2 April 2007 – December 2010
- Sir Bernard Gray: 4 January 2011 – 2015

Chief Executive Officer of Defence Equipment and Support

- Tony Douglas: September 2015 – January 2018
- Michael Bradley: January 2018 – May 2018
- Air Marshal Sir Simon Bollom: May 2018 – September 2022
- Andy Start: September 2022 – October 2025
- Lieutenant General Simon Hamilton: October 2025 – Present
