= John Allison (RAF officer) =

Royal Air Force Air Chief Marshal

Sir John Allison
- Born: 24 March 1943 (age 83)
- Relatives: James Allison (son)
- Military career
- Allegiance: United Kingdom
- Branch: Royal Air Force
- Service years: 1961–99
- Rank: Air Chief Marshal
- Commands: Strike Command (1997–99); Logistics Command (1996–97); No. 11 Group (1991–94); RAF Wildenrath (1982-85); No. 228 Operational Conversion Unit (1977-79)
- Conflicts: Gulf War
- Awards: Knight Commander of the Order of the Bath; Commander of the Order of the British Empire
- Other work: Jaguar Racing (Director of Strategy and Operations Director)

Air Chief Marshal Sir John Shakespeare Allison, KCB, CBE (born 24 March 1943) is a retired senior Royal Air Force (RAF) commander. He was the gentleman usher to the Sword of State.

== RAF career ==
Educated at the Royal Grammar School, Guildford, Allison entered the Royal Air Force College Cranwell as a flight cadet in 1961. On graduation, he was commissioned as a pilot officer in July 1964. Flying the F-4 Phantom, he went on to command No. 228 OCU, then Station Commander at RAF Wildenrath, and Secretary to the Chiefs of Staff Committee at the Ministry of Defence.

He returned to the Ministry of Defence as Director of Air Force Plans and Programmes in 1987 and then became Assistant Chief of Defence Staff, Operational Requirements (Air) in 1989. Allison was appointed Air Officer Commanding No. 11 Group in 1991. He went to become Chief of Staff and Deputy Commander-in-Chief of RAF Strike Command in 1994 and then Commander-in-Chief of RAF Logistics Command in 1996. He served as Air Officer Commanding RAF Strike Command from 25 July 1997 to 28 March 1999 when he retired from the RAF.

Allison was piloting the last airworthy Second World War German Messerschmitt Bf 109 when he made a forced landing at an air show in Duxford in October 1997. The incident occurred on the aircraft's last planned flight before being placed as permanent static display at RAF Duxford. Allison had 4,612 hours of flying experience across his career, though only 18 hours on this particular aircraft type. A report by the Air Accidents Investigation Branch concluded that Allison had manually operated the cooling system of the Daimler Benz DB605A engine into a level of overheating, and had interpreted the thermostat-controlled release of coolant fluid to be an indicator of imminent engine failure. Allison made an attempt to land at the designated airstrip but approached too fast, aborting landing and climbing to an altitude to pass over the M11 motorway. Allison then attempted to land in a ploughed field nearby, but the aircraft nosed over and the pilot became trapped until rescue workers arrived. Alison was unharmed.

== Later career ==
He is still a pilot, flying his own light aircraft as well as the Shuttleworth Collection of vintage and historic aircraft at Old Warden Aerodrome, UK. He flies the Spitfire and other similar aircraft at air displays. He is a restorer of vintage cars and old airplanes, and is president of the Light Aircraft Association.

He was director of strategy, and subsequently, operations director at Jaguar Racing from May 2001 to October 2004. He left as a result of restructuring following the sale of the company to Red Bull Racing and went to Rolls-Royce plc as project director for the redevelopment of the Bristol Site in February 2005. Allison was elected president of Europe Air Sports in April 2004 and took up the position in November 2004, following the retirement of Oliver Burghelle (France). On 1 December 2005, he was appointed Gentleman Usher to the Sword of State.

One of his sons is a glider pilot, while another, James, is the technical director of the Mercedes-AMG Petronas Formula 1 Team.

Military offices
Preceded by Sir William Wratten	Air Officer Commanding No. 11 Group; 1991–1994	Succeeded by Anthony Bagnall
Preceded by Sir Richard Johns	Deputy Commander-in-Chief Strike Command; 1994–1996	Succeeded by Graeme Robertson
Preceded by Sir Michael Alcock	Air Officer Commanding-in-Chief Logistics Command; 1996–1997	Succeeded by Sir Colin Terry
Preceded by Sir William Wratten	Air Officer Commander-in-Chief Strike Command; 1997–1999	Succeeded by Sir Peter Squire
Honorary titles
Preceded by Sir William Wratten	Air Aide-de-Camp to Her Majesty The Queen; 1997–1999	Succeeded by Sir Peter Squire
Court offices
Preceded by Sir Michael Layard	Gentleman Usher to the Sword of State; 2005–present	Incumbent
