= Staff car =

Vehicle used by a senior military officer

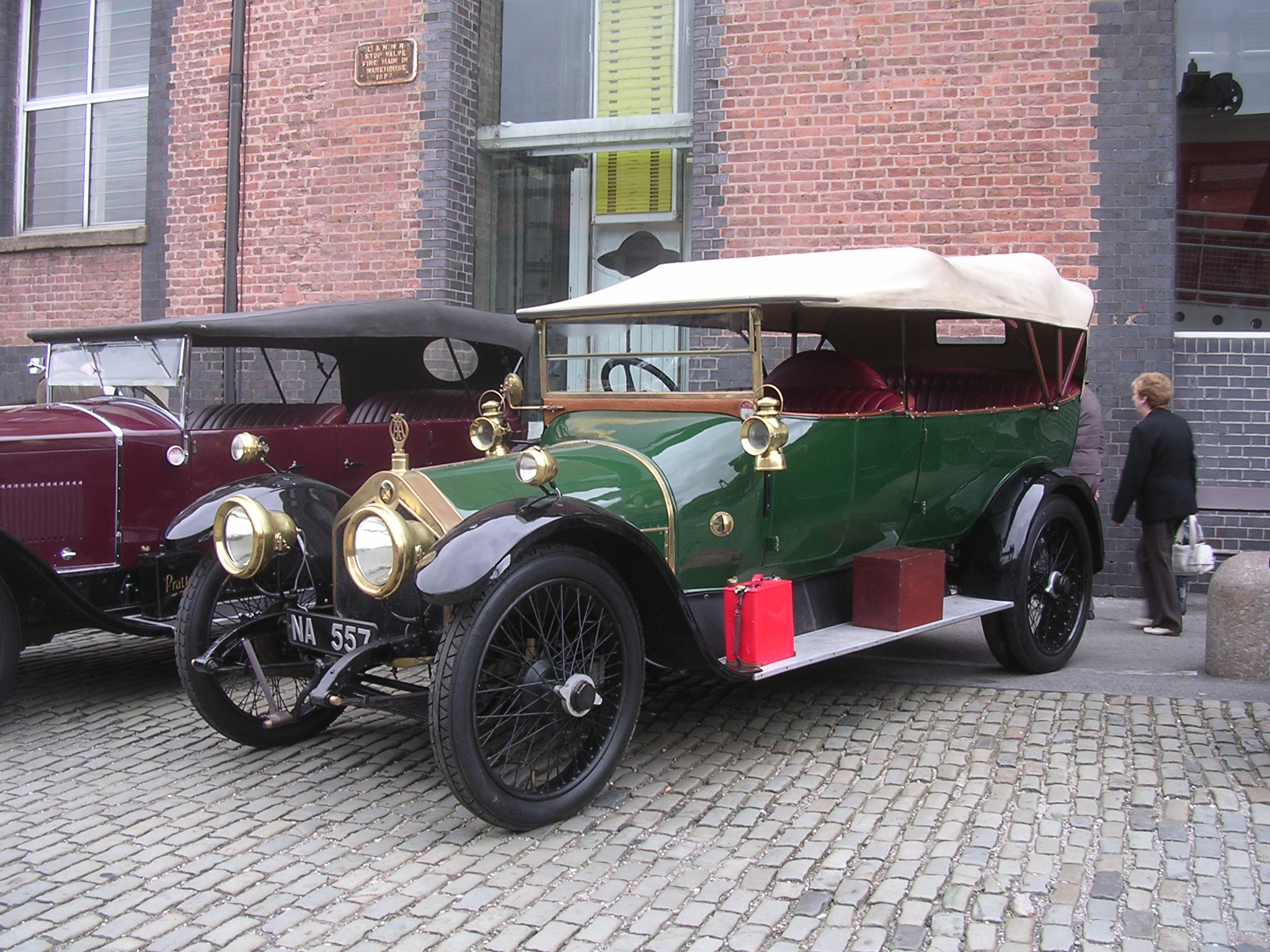
Crossley 20/25 Royal Flying Corps Staff car

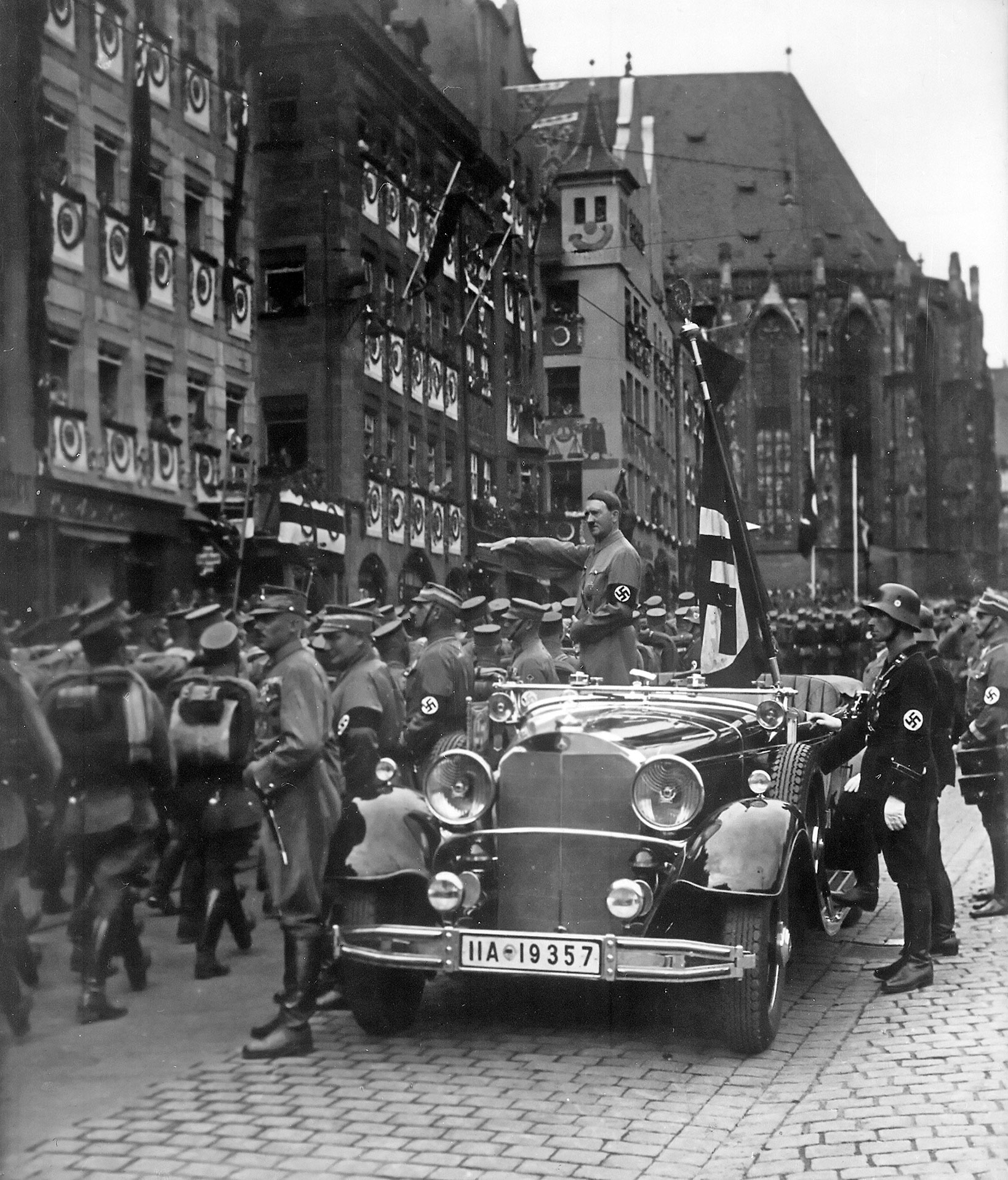
Hitler saluting troops from atop his staff car, a Mercedes-Benz 770k.

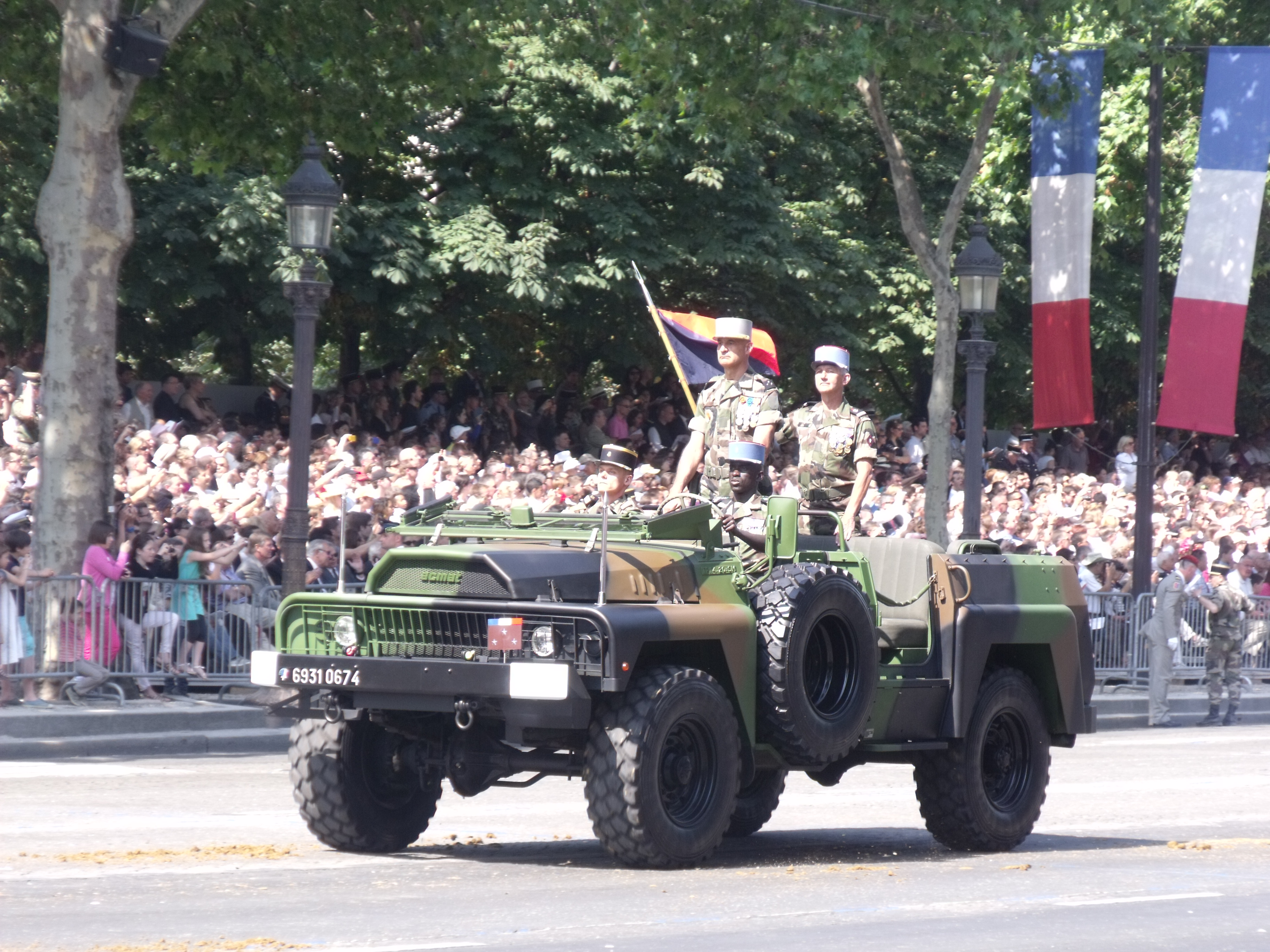
French Army ACMAT VLRA seen for the Bastille Day 2013 military parade.

A staff car is a vehicle used by a senior military officer, and is part of their country's white fleet. The term is most often used in relation to the United Kingdom where they were first used in quantity during World War I, examples being the Vauxhall D-type and Crossley 20/25.

Staff cars are often painted in camouflage colours, or plain black. In the U.S., Brazil and other American countries the frequent colour is flat olive-drab as used on the 1941 Buick Century Series 60, used during the Second World War. It was generally painted in khaki, with a white star on the front doors. Gen. Dwight D. Eisenhower, commander in chief of the Allied Forces on the Western Front during World War II, used a Packard Clipper 1942 staff car. The Plymouth P11 1941 was also used frequently.

During the Second World War the German Wehrmacht (armed forces) also used staff cars for various purposes. These included military models with machine gun mounts like the Horch 108 and converted civilian versions for high-ranking officers like the Horch 853. Mercedes-Benz also produced vehicles that the Wehrmacht converted for use as staff cars.

Field Marshal Bernard Montgomery used a 1939 Rolls-Royce Wraith during the war and continued to use it while serving as Commander of the British Army of the Rhine and as Chief of the Imperial General Staff. It was used by successive Chiefs of the Imperial General Staff until its retirement in 1964. Currently it is on display at the Royal Logistic Corps Museum.

== In popular culture ==
The Dad's Army episodes "The Captain's Car" and "The Making of Private Pike" deal with staff cars; in the former case, the car was donated by a local aristocrat.

Staff cars were also used in the American television sitcom Hogan's Heroes, in which Colonel Wilhelm Klink (Werner Klemperer) and General Albert Burkhalter (Leon Askin) both had staff cars that they frequently used throughout the series.

== See also ==
- List of established military terms
