= Green fleet =

Combat vehicle term

Green fleet refers to the combat specific vehicles of armed forces.

== Canada ==
In Canada, the Green fleet refers to the vehicles which are capable of overseas operations, as well as militarized vehicles held by the Primary Reserve.

The Blue fleet refers to civilian vehicles held by the Department of National Defence and the Canadian Forces which may or may not be taken off-road.

== United Kingdom ==
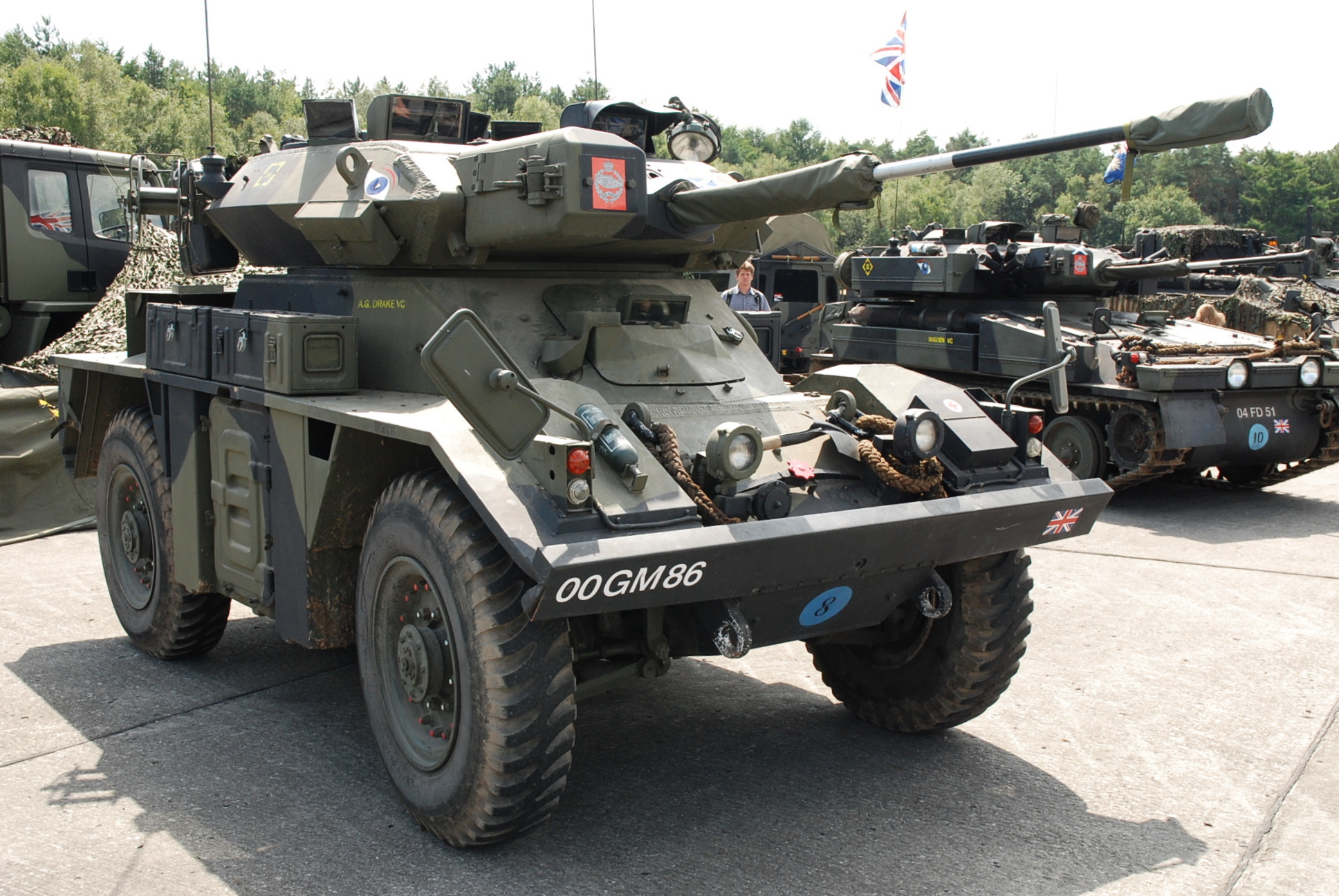
Fox and Scimitar AFVs with military registration numbers

The term is used in the United Kingdom to describe operational military vehicles belonging to the Ministry of Defence. The term arises from the olive green colour of military vehicles for camouflage reasons, although green fleet vehicles could be of any colour (such as vehicles in desert camouflage or red RAF fire engines). Green fleet vehicles carry military registration numbers, unlike civilian registered white fleet vehicles.
