= White fleet (military vehicles) =

Non-combat vehicles

A white fleet comprises the non-combat vehicles of armed forces. Such vehicles include vans, minibuses, coach buses, touring recruitment vehicles, and staff cars for high-ranking officers.

The term "white fleet" sees use in several countries - including Australia, New Zealand, and the UK - with reference to fleet management of the defence vehicular assets. The concept contrasts with combat vehicles - the so-called green fleet.

== Australia ==
As of 2015 Australian Department of Defence white fleet vehicles are leased from SG Fleet under contract.

== United Kingdom ==
The UK Ministry of Defence's white fleet ownership was outsourced in 2001 on a 10-year contract to Lex Defence. The contract through a series of acquisitions now comes under the control of Babcock International.
