= Naval Support Command (Germany) =

German Navy Support Command

Coordinates: 53.5255345°N 8.0285523°E

Navy Support Command
- Marineunterstützungskommando
- Insignia of the Marineunterstützungskommando
- Founded: 1 October 2012; 14 years ago
- Country: Germany
- Branch: German Navy
- Type: Navy Command
- Size: ~1100 personnel
- Part of: German Navy
- Garrison/HQ: Schortens

Commanders
- Commander: Captain Matthias Potthoff

The Marineunterstützungskommando (MUKdo) is a command authority of the German Navy. The advance detachment began in the spring of 2012 in Roffhausen near Wilhelmshaven on the site of the former Olympic works with the establishment of the office. The command was set up on October 1, 2012. It has 1142 military and civil service posts at 16 locations with a focus on the Wilhelmshaven area and Eckernförde. In Virginia Beach there is a branch that serves the connection to the United States Navy.

== Task ==
As part of the marine inspector's responsibility for operations and supplies, the MUKdo ensures the operational readiness and availability of the fleet.

Department I Operations Support Technology / Logistics handles fundamental technical matters relating to the Navy, including material maintenance and technical tests. It includes the navy's senior engineers for ship technology, weapons / sensors and aircraft of the navy. In addition, technical matters of the airborne weapon systems and the naval land units are processed.

Department II operational support / operational testing has essentially been formed from the previous departments Kommando Marineführungssysteme in the Heppenser Groden naval base and Zentrum Einsatzprüfung in Eckernförde, which were incorporated into the Navy Support Command on October 1, 2012. It includes the chief engineer for command, control and control systems.

Department III Command Support is responsible for operating command support in the Navy. You are subordinate to, among other things, the land radio stations of the Navy, z. B. the marine radio station Rhauderfehn.

== Gallery ==
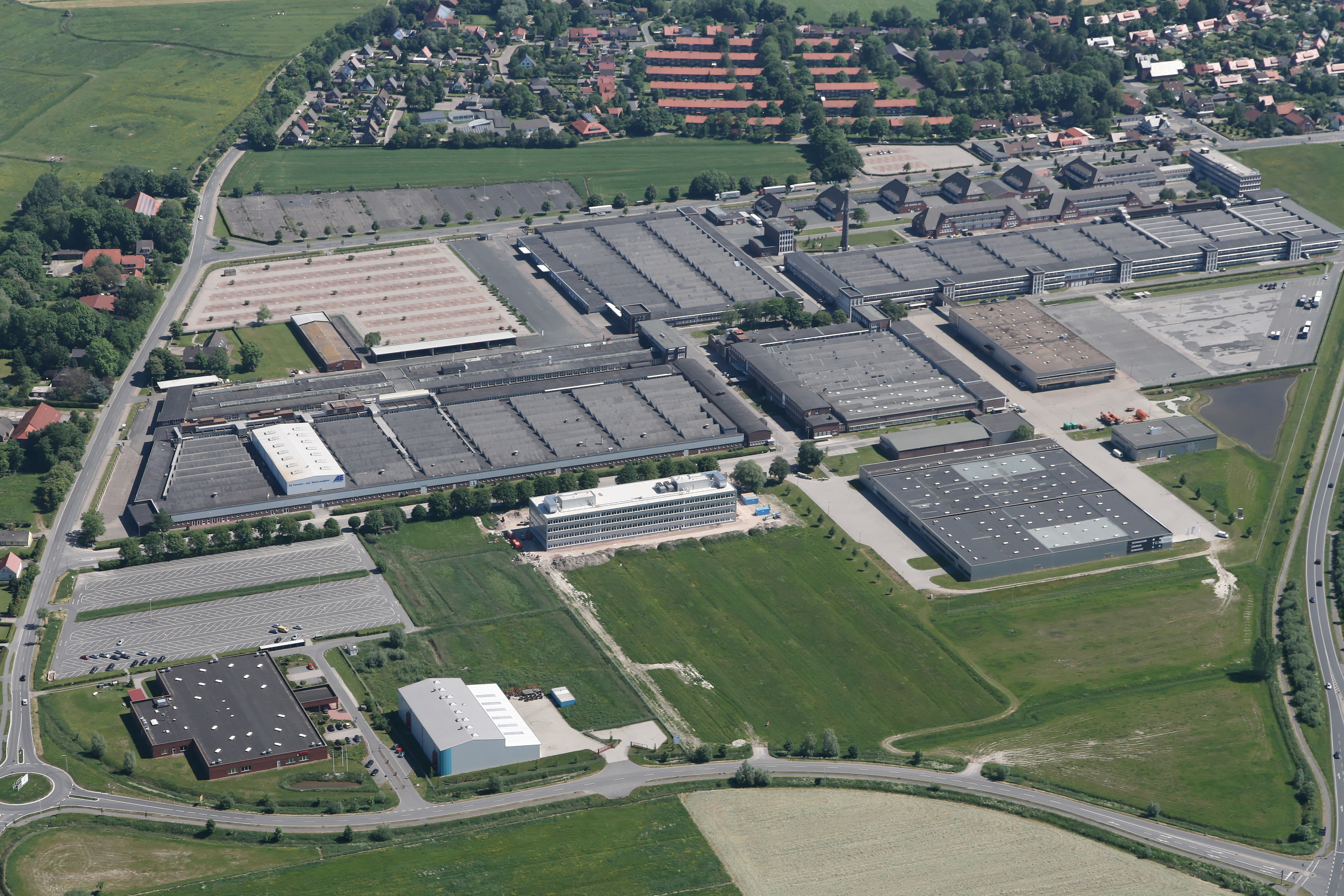
Headquarters of the MUKdo in the former Olympia works in Roffhausen
