= Defence Logistics Organisation =

Former executive agency in the UK

Agency overview
- Formed: 2000–2007
- Superseding agency: Defence Equipment and Support
- Jurisdiction: United Kingdom
- Headquarters: London, England
- Agency executive: Chief of Defence Logistics
- Parent agency: Ministry of Defence

The Defence Logistics Organisation (DLO) was a key element of the UK Ministry of Defence, responsible for supporting the armed forces throughout the various stages of an operation or exercise; from training, deployment, in-theatre training and conduct of operations, through to recovery and recuperation ready for redeployment.

Led by the Chief of Defence Logistics, a four-star officer, the DLO maintained and upgraded military equipment and coordinated its storage and distribution. It had an annual spend of almost £9 billion, representing over 20 per cent of the Defence budget. The DLO employed around 28,000 staff at 80 locations throughout the UK and overseas, and had its headquarters in Bath, England.

== History ==
The Organisation was created in 2000 by the Ministry of Defence ('MOD') who brought together all the logistics departments and MOD central agencies together under a joint command. As of 1 April 2007 the DLO was merged with the Defence Procurement Agency to form a new organisation called Defence Equipment and Support.

== Organisation ==
The DLO was organised along three levels, focusing on output, support and direction.

=== The Delivery Layer ===
The Delivery Layer was the customer facing element of the DLO; Integrated Project Teams (IPTs), Naval Bases, Depots, and other front line support units. To provide a single point of accountability for all DLO outputs the DLO assigned Domain two stars whose role was to externally face principal customers. They were - with rank of appointment:

Director General Logistics (Fleet) - Rear Admiral

Land Director General Logistics (Land) - Major General

Strike Director General Logistics (Strike) - Air Vice-Marshal

Director General Logistics (Supply Chain) - Major General

IPTs were brigaded into one-star cluster groups around customer outputs and products to improve coherence and effectiveness:

=== Enabling Layer ===
The Enabling Layer provided a range of specialist support to IPTs and others within the DLO and the DPA. The nature, structure, process and size of the enabling layer was defined from the restructuring work which ran throughout 2004. The enabling services became more streamlined than before and were set up to improve ways of working.

=== Defence Logistics Board ===
The DLO Board was chaired by the Chief of Defence Logistics. It provided strategic leadership, direction and governance to the DLO and acted as the ultimate decision-making body in the DLO. It was supported by the Output Board, Enabling Services Board and Procurement Board.

The DLO Board provided strategic direction to meet the current challenges and future logistics requirements of the front line customers and stakeholders effectively. The strategy provided a framework to help people make decisions that align with the overall direction of the DLO.

==== Board Membership ====
As at March 2007:

- Chief of Defence Logistics (CDL) - General
- Deputy Chief of Defence Logistics (DCDL) - Senior Civil Servant.
- Director General Logistics (Fleet) - DGLog (Fleet) - Rear Admiral
- Director General Logistics (Land) - DGLog (Land) - Major General
- Director General Logistics (Strike) - DGLog (Strike) - Air Vice-Marshal
- Director General Logistics (Supply Chain) - DGLog (SuppChn) - Major General
- Director General Nuclear - DGNuc - Rear Admiral
- Director General Logistics (Procurement) - Senior Civil Servant
- Director General Defence Logistic Transformation (DLTP) - Air Vice-Marshal
- Director General Logistics (Resources) - DGLog (Res) - Senior Civil Servant
- Technical Director - Rear Admiral
- Assistant Chief of Defence Staff (Logistics Operations) - ACDS (LogOps) - Air Vice-Marshal
- Director General Acquisition People - DGAP - Senior Civil Servant
- Chief Executive Defence Communications Services Agency - CE DCSA - Rear Admiral

In addition there were two Non-Executive directors who also sat on the board.

== Activities ==
=== Restructuring ===
The DLO was undertaking a major restructuring programme, aimed at improving the efficiency and effectiveness of the organisation. The first phase of restructuring concentrated mainly on making the enabling layer more effective. The second phase, which began in April 2005, was to embed the changes to date and improve effectiveness across the whole organisation in order to deliver equipment better to the armed forces.

=== Co-location ===
Work was underway to co-locate parts of the DLO with the DPA in the Bristol/Bath area to create an acquisition hub. This initiative is continuing to be implemented by DE&S.

=== Procurement Reform ===
Procurement Reform was a separate but integral part of the Defence Logistics Transformation Programme, focusing specifically on industry where the DLO spends about 80 per cent of its money. Over 30 market-facing Category Management Teams have been set up to support IPTs in addressing areas of spend and identifying savings and improvements. For some categories the scope extends into the rest of the department to establish a more corporate approach to procurement across MOD.

=== DLO/DPA Joint Working ===
Joint Working was intended to improve the way the DLO and DPA (Defence Procurement Agency) worked together. The aim is to harmonise processes and minimise burden on the delivering and enabling groups, ensuring that we work efficiently and minimise duplications of effort. It is about reducing burden, increasing efficiency and improving coherence for IPTs and enabling services, and aligning strategic direction.

=== Defence Industrial Strategy ===
The Defence Industrial Strategy (DIS) follows and enforces the Defence Industrial Policy and the need to provide the armed forces with the equipment which they require, on time, and at best value for money for the taxpayer. It had a significant bearing on how the DLO conducted its business. It requires: Focus on through life capability management, developing how support is to be applied through life and how incremental acquisition is used to maintain capability at the cutting edge of technology. Identification of appropriate sovereign capability to be maintained. A clear understanding of the impact of procurement strategies on industry's capability, at both supplier and sector levels, current and future. Transparency with industry to shape medium and long term strategic decisions and to create partnering agreements. These arrangements will be used to underpin and demonstrate value for money for defence, with competition still being used where appropriate. Identification and development of the right skills and shared values to enable the acquisition community to deliver the most effective solutions.

=== Defence Logistic Programme ===
UK armed forces must be capable of responding to a complex variety of threats worldwide. Logistics support also has to change to keep pace with demands around the operational planning cycle. CDL was appointed as departmental process owner for logistics by the Defence Management Board in 2004 to ensure coherence in responding to this requirement. Supported by the Defence Logistics Board (DLB), whose members include front line commanders and representatives of MOD Centre, CDL's vision for defence logistics was for it to be a highly effective, agile and network-capable component that enhances the commander's ability to execute his mission successfully. CDL stated that:

All levels of operational command have confidence that the right logistics support will be delivered to each phase of operational activity.

The logistics changes required to meet this intent, which cross organisational boundaries, were contained in the Defence Logistics Programme launched in April 2006. This set out the strategic direction for logistics, allowing the DLB to manage the performance of logistics, provided an assessment of areas in which defence logistics must move forward over a 15-year period, and developed a programme for the next five years.

== See also ==
- Ministry of Defence (United Kingdom)
- Green fleet
- White fleet
