= Defence Equipment and Support =

British government procurement arm

Coordinates: 51.5033°N 2.55917°W

Agency overview
- Formed: 2 April 2007
- Preceding agencies: Defence Procurement Agency; Defence Logistics Organisation
- Superseding agency: Submarine Delivery Agency (partial)
- Jurisdiction: United Kingdom
- Headquarters: MoD Abbey Wood; Bristol, England, UK
- Minister responsible: Rt Hon Luke Pollard, MP, Minister of State for Defence Readiness and Industry
- Agency executive: Lieutenant General Simon Hamilton CBE, Chief Executive Officer of Defence Equipment and Support
- Parent department: Ministry of Defence
- Child agencies: DE&S Deca; Defence Munitions
- Website: https://des.mod.uk/

Defence Equipment and Support (DE&S) is a trading entity and joint-defence organisation within the UK Ministry of Defence based in Bristol, England. It began operating on 2 April 2007, following the merger of the MoD's Defence Procurement Agency and the Defence Logistics Organisation, under the Chief Executive Officer of Defence Equipment and Support.

In 2022, the DE&S workforce was around 11,500 with the majority based at MoD Abbey Wood in Bristol.

== History ==
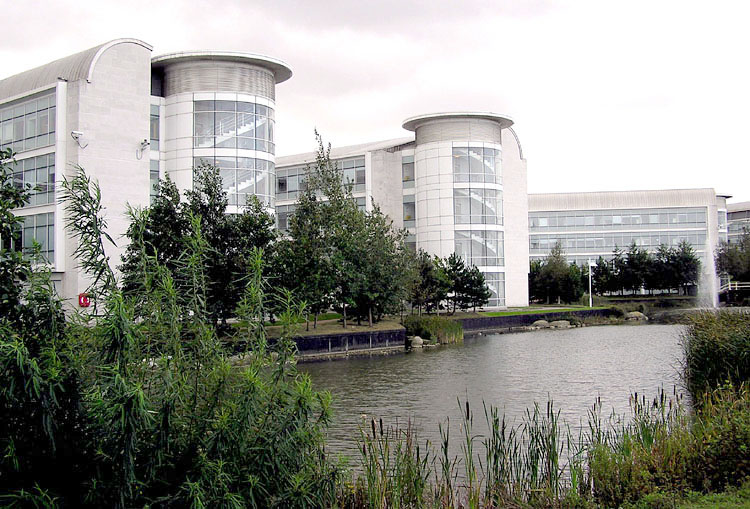
DE&S headquarters, Abbey Wood, Bristol

Defence Equipment and Support was established on 2 April 2007 with General Sir Kevin O'Donoghue as its first CEO.

Responsibility for 'Logistics, Commodities and Services' (including storage and delivery of non-weaponry equipment, such as food and clothing, to soldiers) was contracted out to the private sector in 2015 under an arrangement that included the transfer of 1,100 staff and construction of a new Defence Fulfilment Centre at MoD Donnington.

In September 2022, Andy Start was appointed CEO of the organisation, joining from an executive role in Capita plc and replacing Air Marshal Sir Simon Bollom.

On 1 April 2024, the former Defence Electronics & Components Agency was merged into the wider DE&S organisation to form an autonomous operating centre to be known as DE&S Deca.

== Major projects ==
DE&S manages over 600 defence procurement and support programmes for the UK's armed services.

== Main locations ==
As of 2016 the main locations (with staff numbers) were:

- MoD Abbey Wood (7,920) – Head Office
- DM Beith (220) – Defence Munitions
- MoD Bicester (140) – Logistics
- HMNB Clyde (100) – Fleet Support and Defence Munitions
- HMNB Devonport (220) – Fleet Support and Defence Munitions
- DM Kineton (240) – Defence Munitions
- DM Longtown (120) – Defence Munitions
- Ministry of Defence, London (90) – Policy
- RAF Northolt (210) – British Forces Post Office
- HMNB Portsmouth and DM Gosport (350) – Fleet Support and Defence Munitions
- Rosyth Dockyard (120) – Fleet Support and Defence Munitions
- RAF Waddington (170) – ISTAR Support
- Yeovil (410) – Helicopter Support
