= Frederic Dreyer =

Royal Navy Admiral (1878–1956)

Admiral Sir Frederic Dreyer GBE KCB
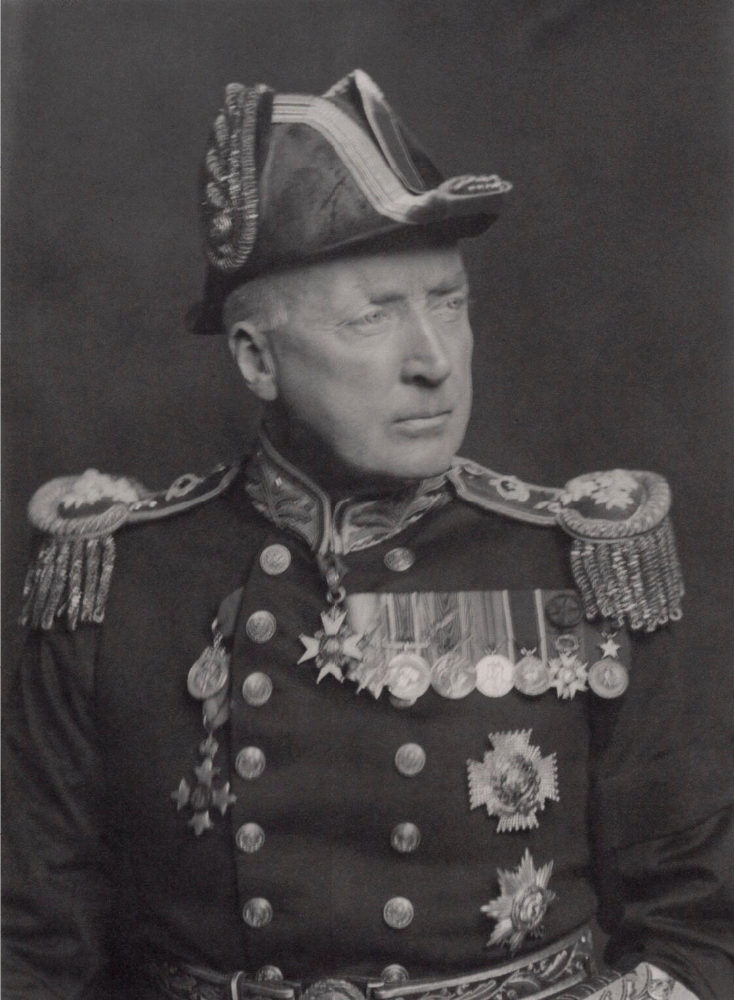
- Born: 8 January 1878; Parsonstown, Ireland
- Died: 11 December 1956 (aged 78); Winchester, England
- Relatives: Major General John Tuthill Dreyer (brother); Admiral Sir Desmond Dreyer (son)
- Military career
- Allegiance: United Kingdom
- Branch: Royal Navy
- Service years: 1891–1943
- Rank: Admiral
- Commands: China Station (1933–36); Battlecruiser Squadron (1927–29); HMS Repulse (1922–23); HMS Iron Duke (1915–16); HMS Orion (1913–15); HMS Amphion (1913)
- Conflicts: First World War: Battle of Jutland; Second World War
- Awards: Knight Grand Cross of the Order of the British Empire; Knight Commander of the Order of the Bath

Admiral Sir Frederic Charles Dreyer (8 January 1878 – 11 December 1956) was an officer of the Royal Navy. A gunnery expert, he developed a fire control system for British warships, and served as flag captain to Admiral Sir John Jellicoe at the Battle of Jutland. He retired with the rank of admiral in 1943, having served through two world wars and having already retired once.

== Background and early life ==
Frederic Dreyer was born on 8 January 1878 in the Irish town of Parsonstown (now Birr) in King's County (now County Offaly), the second son of the Danish-born astronomer John Louis Emil Dreyer who was director of the Armagh Observatory. Educated at The Royal School, Armagh, in 1891 Dreyer joined the Royal Navy and entered the Royal Naval College, Dartmouth.

== Royal Navy career ==
=== Early years ===
At Dartmouth Dreyer performed well in his examinations and was placed fifth in his term. He then served as a midshipman in HMS Anson (1893–1896) and HMS Barfleur (1896–1897). In nearly all his subsequent examinations for promotions he obtained Class 1 certificates—for sub-lieutenant, lieutenant (July 1898, while aboard HMS Repulse) and then gunnery lieutenant. In 1900 he authored a book called How to Get a First Class in Seamanship. He came first in his class of three in the advanced course for gunnery and torpedo lieutenants at the Royal Naval College, Greenwich, in 1901, after which he was posted to the staff of the gunnery school at Sheerness. He served as gunnery officer to the cruiser HMS Scylla for annual manoeuvres during summer 1902, then was lent to the protected cruiser HMS Hawke for a trooping trip to the Mediterranean (August–September 1902). He was appointed to the battleship HMS Hood in the Mediterranean from September 1902, but the ship's rudder had been damaged and the ship proceeded home to be repaired and paid off at Plymouth. Dreyer was reappointed to the Hawke on 13 January 1903 for another trooping voyage to Malta, and when she was paid off in March, he was appointed to the staff of HMS Excellent, then under the command of Captain Percy M. Scott. After two months at Excellent, Scott submitted Dreyer's name for appointment as gunnery officer to the new battleship HMS Exmouth.

From June 1903, Dreyer was posted as gunnery officer to the Exmouth in the Mediterranean. In 1904 Exmouth became the flagship of the British Home Fleet whereupon he became gunnery advisor to the Commander-in-Chief, Admiral Sir Arthur Wilson. From 1904 to 1907 Exmouth came first in the Home Fleet's (later Channel Fleet) gunlayer tests and battle practices. In 1905 he served on a calibration committee chaired by the Inspector of Target Practice, Rear Admiral Percy Scott. He was posted as experimental gunnery officer to the first dreadnought battleship HMS Dreadnought on her experimental cruise of 1907 on "Special Service" to assist with gunnery trials.

=== Admiralty and war service ===
On his return, and upon the recommendation of Admiral Wilson, Dreyer was promoted commander and appointed an Assistant to the Director of Naval Ordnance (DNO), John Jellicoe. At the end of 1907 he assisted in the trials of Arthur Hungerford Pollen's Argo rangefinder mounting and plotter on the cruiser HMS Ariadne. He returned to the Admiralty, under the new DNO Captain Reginald Bacon and remained there until 1909, when he was appointed commander (executive officer) in the new dreadnought HMS Vanguard, then completing in Barrow-in-Furness. In 1910 Dreyer was invited by Vice Admiral Jellicoe to be his flag commander, first in HMS Prince of Wales (flagship of the Atlantic Fleet) and then in HMS Hercules (flagship of the 2nd Division of the Home Fleet).

On Jellicoe's advice, Dreyer was given command of the scout cruiser HMS Amphion in 1913, with promotion to captain in June. That year Amphion came first out of the entire navy in the gunlayer's test and first in the vessel's type in battle practice. In October, 1913 he became flag captain (commander of the flagship) to Rear Admiral Sir Robert Arbuthnot in the battleship HMS Orion (flagship Rear Admiral 2nd Battle Squadron) until 1915. At the behest of Jellicoe, now Commander-in-Chief of the Grand Fleet, Dreyer was made flag captain of HMS Iron Duke, serving at the Battle of Jutland in 1916.

Dreyer moved to the Admiralty with Jellicoe as the Assistant Director of the Anti-Submarine Division. In March 1917 he was appointed DNO, where he formed a committee to design and produce a new type of armour-piercing shell, as the existing type had proved woefully unreliable. He was appointed to the Naval Staff as Director of Naval Artillery and Torpedoes in 1918. Following the Armistice he was appointed commodore, 2nd class and served as Chief of Staff to Admiral Jellicoe on his Naval Mission to India and the Dominions on HMS New Zealand, between 1919 and 1920.

=== Post war ===
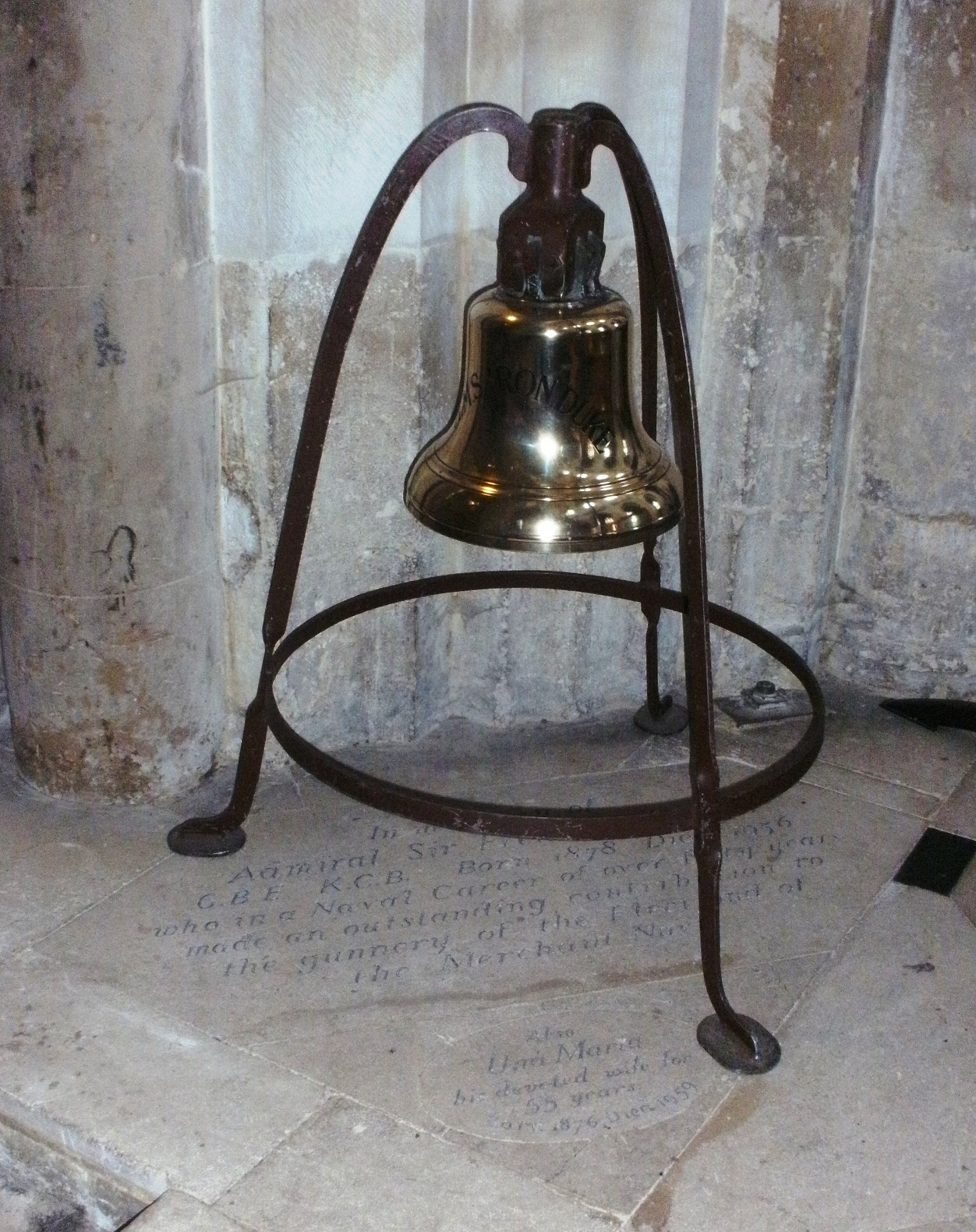
The ship's bell of HMS Iron Duke, which was presented to Winchester Cathedral by Dreyer. The bell stands above a slab commemorating Dreyer and his wife.

Dreyer returned to the Admiralty as Director of the Gunnery Division from 1920 to 1922. He went to sea commanding the battlecruiser HMS Repulse for a year, before serving as Aide-de-camp to HM the King. In late 1923 he was promoted rear admiral. In 1924 he became a Lord Commissioner of Admiralty as Assistant Chief of the Naval Staff, and instituted the Tactical School at Portsmouth.

In 1927 Dreyer returned to sea as commander of the Battlecruiser Squadron, flying his flag in HMS Hood. In 1929 he became a vice admiral and the following year became Deputy Chief of the Naval Staff. He had previously entertained hopes of becoming the commander of the Atlantic Fleet after his tenure at the Admiralty. However, the tainting by association of the Board of which he was part by the Invergordon Mutiny in 1931, with the consequent effect on that fleet, meant that Dreyer was destined never to command it.

In 1932 Dreyer was promoted to full admiral and in 1933 given command of the China Station where he served until 1936. He retired in 1939 only to volunteer as a Convoy Commodore in the Royal Naval Reserve upon the outbreak of the Second World War. He was on the staff of the General Officer Commanding-in-Chief, Home Forces in 1940 as an advisor on anti-invasion measure, before becoming Inspector of Merchant Navy Gunnery (1941–1942). He then was appointed as Chief of Naval Air Services (1942), before his final brief appointment as Deputy Chief of Naval Air Equipment in 1943. He then returned to the retired list for the second time. His memoirs were published as The Sea Heritage: A Study in Maritime Warfare.

== Family life ==
On 26 June 1901 Dreyer married Una Maria Hallett (1876–1959), daughter of John Thomas Hallett, vicar of Bishop's Tachbrook, Warwickshire; they had three sons and two daughters. His elder brother was Major General John Tuthill Dreyer, RA, with whom he worked on his fire control devices.

All three sons and his two sons-in-law were naval officers. His second son was the late Vice Admiral Sir Desmond Dreyer, who also became a gunnery officer, won the Distinguished Service Cross at the Battle of the River Plate, and went on to become Second Sea Lord.

== Honours ==
In 1914 Dreyer was awarded the civilian Companion of the Order of the Bath (CB) for his services to naval gunnery. Following the Battle of Jutland he was awarded the military CB for the behaviour and shooting of Iron Duke in the battle. After the naval mission to the Empire in 1919 he was made a Commander of the Order of the British Empire. In 1932 he was promoted to Knight Commander of the Order of the Bath and to Knight Grand Cross of the Order of the British Empire in 1936.

== Dreyer Fire Control Table ==
The introduction of centralized fire control for warships gave a significant improvement to the accuracy of gunnery. The increasing range of naval guns led by several years the necessary advances to control their fire. Over a ten-year period techniques such as centralised spotting of fall of shot, mechanical computation of rate of change of range (rate), mechanical clocks to calculate range over time for any given "rate" and long baselength optical rangefinders were introduced. In order to make sense of such data, manual plotting of rangefinder ranges, from single or multiple rangefinders as well as other data began to find favour. The Royal Navy sponsored research into these techniques, and two groups emerged, a commercial group led by Arthur Pollen, and a Naval group led by Dreyer. Both camps aimed to produce a combined mechanical computer and automatic plot of ranges and rates for use in centralised fire control. Both systems were ordered for new and existing ships of the Royal Navy, although the Dreyer Table, as the Dreyer system was called eventually found most favour with the Navy in its definitive Mark IV* form.

The addition of director control facilitated a full, practicable fire control system for First World War ships, and most RN capital ships were so fitted by mid 1916. The director was high up over the ship where operators had a superior view over any gunlayer in the turrets. It was also able to co-ordinate the fire of the turrets so that their combined fire worked together. This improved aiming and larger optical rangefinders improved the estimate of the enemy's position at the time of firing. But with the longer practical ranges came the increased time of flight. The Fire Control System now had to account for more variations and more complicated corrections than was originally planned. The Dreyer Table had some mechanical flaws, particularly when additional loads were introduced in the form of unauthorised accoutrements concocted by individual gunnery personnel, but on the whole performed in a satisfactory manner. The system was eventually replaced by the improved "Admiralty Fire Control Table" for ships built after 1927, although Dreyer Tables went to war a second time in World War II, notably in Britain's unmodernised battleships and battlecruisers.

The choice between the Dreyer and Pollen systems was controversial at the time. The Royal Navy had repeatedly tested Pollen's designs and had given him what it considered very preferential terms for them. Pollen in 1925 won an award for £30,000 from the Royal Commission on Awards to Inventors for elements of his Argo Clock that had been used without his permission. At the same time Dreyer applied for a similar grant but due to the fact that in 1915 he had been awarded £5,000 for his services to fire control his request was denied.

== Published works ==
- How to Get a First Class in Seamanship. 1900
- The Sea Heritage: A Study in Maritime Warfare. Museum Press. 1955.

== Notes ==
Military offices
| Preceded by Sir Cyril Fuller | Commander, Battlecruiser Squadron; 1927–1929 | Succeeded by Wilfred Tomkinson |
| Preceded by Sir William Fisher | Deputy Chief of the Naval Staff; 1930–1933 | Succeeded by Sir Charles Little |
| Preceded by Sir Howard Kelly | Commander-in-Chief, China Station; 1933–1936 | Succeeded by Sir Charles Little |
