= Frederick Field (Royal Navy officer) =

Royal Navy Admiral of the Fleet (1871-1945)

Admiral of the Fleet Sir Frederick Field GCB KCMG
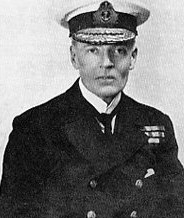
- Admiral of the Fleet Sir Frederick Field
- Born: 18 April 1871; Killarney, County Kerry, Ireland
- Died: 24 October 1945 (aged 74); Escrick, East Riding of Yorkshire, England
- Military career
- Allegiance: United Kingdom
- Branch: Royal Navy
- Service years: 1884–1933
- Rank: Admiral of the Fleet
- Commands: First Sea Lord (1930–33); Mediterranean Fleet (1928–30); Battlecruiser Squadron (1923–25); HMS King George V (1915–16); HMS Vernon (1914–15); HMS Duncan (1910–12); HMS Defiance (1907–09); HMS Jaseur (1902)
- Conflicts: Boxer Rebellion; First World War
- Awards: Knight Grand Cross of the Order of the Bath; Knight Commander of the Order of St Michael and St George; Mentioned in Despatches; Order of Saint Anna, 2nd Class with Swords (Russia); Officer of the Legion of Honour (France); Commander of the Order of the Crown (Romania); Navy Distinguished Service Medal (United States)

Admiral of the Fleet Sir Frederick Laurence Field, GCB, KCMG (18 April 1871 – 24 October 1945) was a senior Royal Navy officer. He served in the Boxer Rebellion as commander of a raiding party and in the First World War as commanding officer of the battleship HMS King George V, flagship of Admiral Martyn Jerram at the Battle of Jutland in May 1916. He went on to be Commander-in-Chief, Mediterranean Fleet before serving as First Sea Lord during the early 1930s, in which role he dealt with the response to the Invergordon Mutiny in September 1931 and ensured the abandonment in 1932 of the 'ten-year rule', an attempt by the treasury to control defence expenditure by requesting the Foreign Office to declare whether there was any risk of war during the next ten years.

== Early career ==
Born the second son of Colonel Spencer Field, 6th Royal Warwickshire Regiment, and Catherine Field (née Darrah), Field was educated privately before joining the Royal Navy as a cadet in the training ship HMS Britannia in 1884. He was posted as a midshipman to the armoured frigate HMS Minotaur in the Channel Squadron in November 1886. He transferred to the armoured cruiser HMS Imperieuse on the China Station in March 1888 and to the corvette HMS Constance also on the China Station in early 1889. Promoted to sub-lieutenant on 14 November 1890, he was posted to the battleship HMS Dreadnought in the Mediterranean Fleet in April 1892. Promoted again to lieutenant on 1 April 1893, he joined the corvette HMS Volage in the Training Squadron in October 1894 before attending the torpedo school HMS Vernon from November 1895.

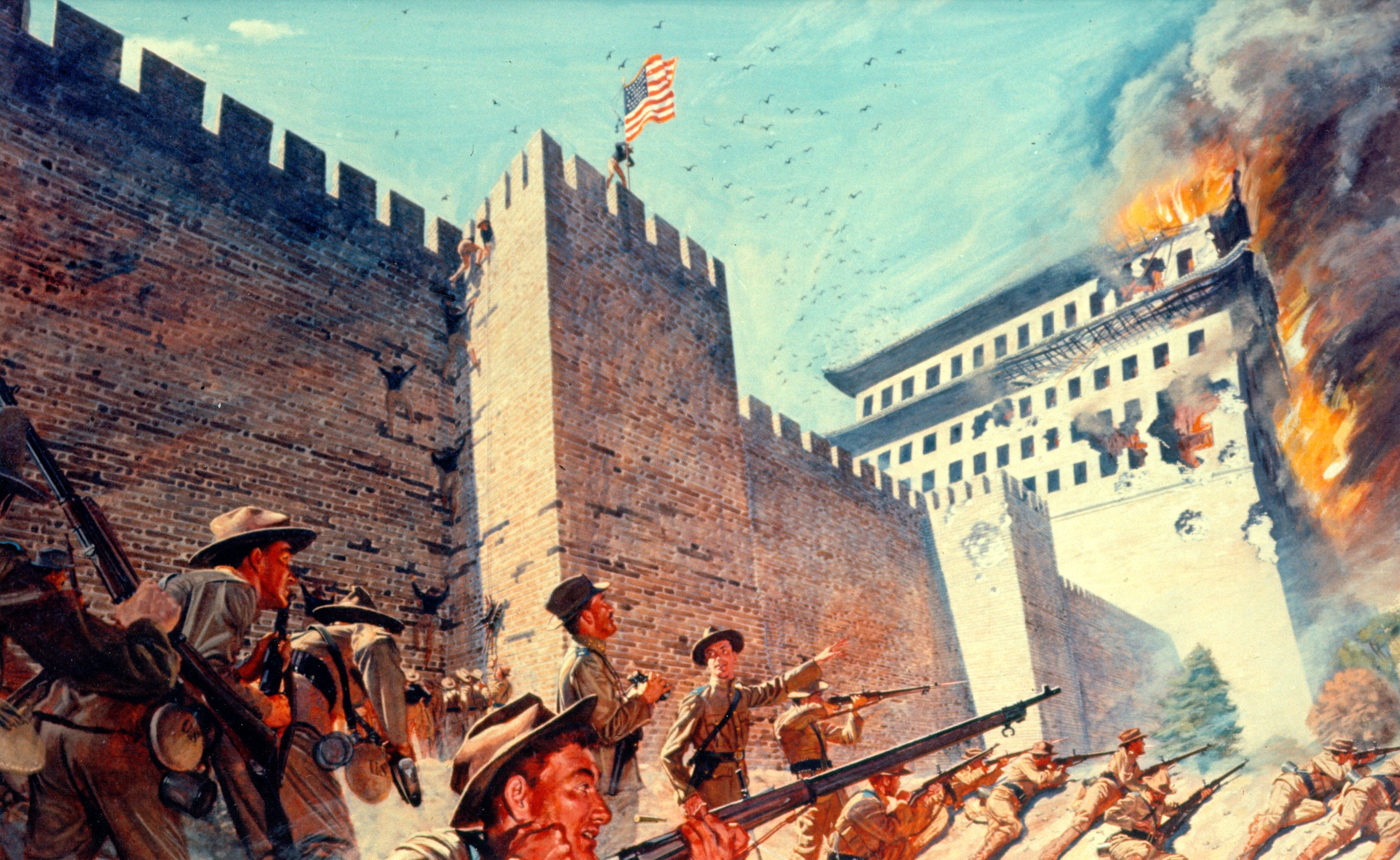
The Boxer Rebellion during which Field led a raiding party

After serving on the directing staff at the torpedo school HMS Defiance at Devonport, Field became torpedo officer in HMS Barfleur on the China Station in July 1898. He was mentioned in despatches for leading a small raiding party which landed at Tianjin in response to the Boxer Rebellion tasked with repairing damaged trains under heavy fire: he was wounded during the action.

Promoted to commander on 26 June 1902, Field was on the same day posted to HMS Vernon, in command of the torpedo gunboat HMS Jaseur. He was posted to the battleship HMS Albion on the China Station in early August 1902, before rejoining the staff at HMS Vernon in 1904. Promoted to captain on 31 December 1907, he became commanding officer of HMS Defiance, the torpedo school at Devonport. He was given command of HMS Duncan as flag captain to Admiral Martyn Jerram, Commander-in-Chief of the Mediterranean Fleet in 1910 and then became superintendent of the Royal Navy signal schools in 1912.

== First World War ==
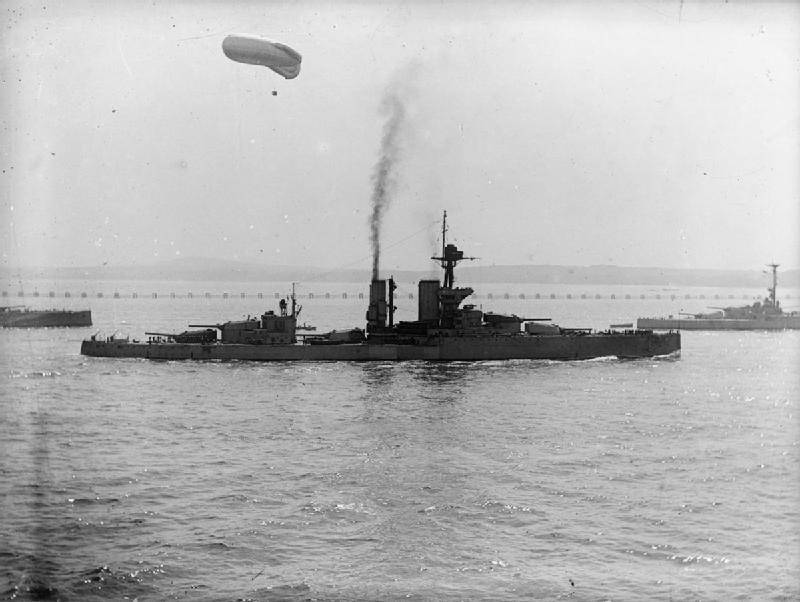
The battleship HMS King George V which Field commanded at the Battle of Jutland

Field saw service during the First World War, initially as Captain of HMS Vernon and then as commanding officer of the battleship HMS King George V, flagship of Admiral Jerram at the Battle of Jutland in May 1916. The King George was assigned as the lead ship of the 2nd Battle Squadron. He was applauded for "the great skill with which he handled the King George V, as leader of the line, under very difficult conditions". During the battle, his ship fired two salvoes at SMS Derfflinger but had to turn away to enable friendly cruisers to manoeuvre ahead.

Appointed a Companion of the Order of the Bath on 15 September 1916, he became chief of staff to Sir Charles Madden, commanding the 1st Battle Squadron in November 1916 and, having been appointed to the Russian Order of Saint Anna, 2nd Class with Swords on 5 June 1917, he became Director of Torpedoes and Mining at the Admiralty in June 1918.

He was appointed a Naval Aide-de-Camp to the King on 26 October 1918. In recognition of his war service he was appointed an Officer of the French Legion of Honour on 12 December 1918, a Commander of the Romanian Order of the Crown on 17 March 1919, and a Companion of the Order of St Michael and St George on 17 July 1919. He was also awarded the United States Navy Distinguished Service Medal on 16 September 1919.

== Flag officer ==
Promoted to the rank of rear admiral on 11 February 1919, Field became Third Sea Lord and Controller of the Navy in March 1920. Advanced to Knight Commander of the Order of the Bath in the 1923 New Year Honours, he was given the command of the Battlecruiser Squadron with his flag in the battlecruiser HMS Hood early that year. He took the squadron, comprising HMS Hood, the battlecruiser HMS Repulse and the light cruisers HMS Delhi, HMS Dauntless, HMS Danae, HMS Dragon and HMS Dunedin, on an "Empire Cruise" between November 1923 and September 1924. Promoted to vice admiral on 26 September 1924, he was advanced to Knight Commander of the Order of St Michael and St George three days later for his service on the Empire Cruise. He went on to be Deputy Chief of the Naval Staff in May 1925 and, having been promoted to admiral on 5 April 1928, he became Commander-in-Chief, Mediterranean Fleet in June 1928.

== First Sea Lord ==
Field became First Sea Lord in July 1930. The greatest crisis faced by Field at the Admiralty was the pay crisis and mutiny that soon followed. With the ongoing effects of worldwide depression and budget restrictions, a 25% pay cut was introduced across the fleet and one shilling per day was taken from every naval man. It were these proposed measures which led to the Invergordon Mutiny in September 1931 when the sailors of the Atlantic Fleet at Invergordon left their ships and refused duty. Many of the officers at the time state that the mutiny at Invergordon was a direct result of the action of the Admiralty in accepting the cuts in pay for the crews. While the First Sea Lord was the principle advisor to the First Lord of the Admiralty on naval matters, Admiral Field was ill at the time of the incident and the First Lord Austen Chamberlain had proceeded ahead without being able to discuss the cuts with Field. At King George V's insistence, Admiral Sir John Kelly, who was popular with the fleet, was brought out of retirement to take command of the Atlantic Fleet, and the cabinet, acting on Field's advice, hurriedly reconsidered its budget: the pay cuts were restricted to 10% rather than 25%. During the early months of this crisis, Field's illness was confirmed as a perforated ulcer.

It was also primarily Field's work in the Committee of Imperial Defence that led to the abandonment in 1932 of the 'ten year rule'. This had been an attempt by the treasury to control defence expenditure by requesting the Foreign Office to declare whether there was any risk of war during the next ten years.

Field retired as First Sea Lord in January 1933 and was promoted to admiral of the fleet on 21 January. He was advanced to Knight Grand Cross of the Order of the Bath in the 1933 Birthday Honours, and was Chairman of the Royal Navy Club of 1765 and 1785 (United 1889) for the years 1935 to 1937. He retired to his home at Escrick Park near Escrick in the East Riding of Yorkshire (now North Yorkshire) where he died from cancer on 24 October 1945.

== Family ==
In 1902, Field married Annie Jackson (née Harris); the couple had no children.

== Sources ==
- Heathcote, Tony (2002). The British Admirals of the Fleet 1734 – 1995. Pen & Sword Ltd. ISBN 0-85052-835-6.

Military offices
Preceded by Sir William Nicholson	Third Sea Lord and Controller of the Navy; 1920–1923	Succeeded by Sir Cyril Fuller
Preceded by Sir Walter Cowan	Commander, Battlecruiser Squadron; 1923–1925	Succeeded by Sir Cyril Fuller
Preceded by Sir Roger Keyes	Deputy Chief of the Naval Staff; 1925–1928	Succeeded by Sir William Fisher
Preceded by Sir Roger Keyes	Commander-in-Chief, Mediterranean Fleet; 1928–1930	Succeeded by Sir Ernle Chatfield
Preceded by Sir Charles Madden	First Sea Lord; 1930–1933	Succeeded by Sir Ernle Chatfield
