= Dudley Pound =

Royal Navy Admiral of the Fleet (1877–1943)

Admiral of the Fleet Sir Dudley Pound GCB OM GCVO
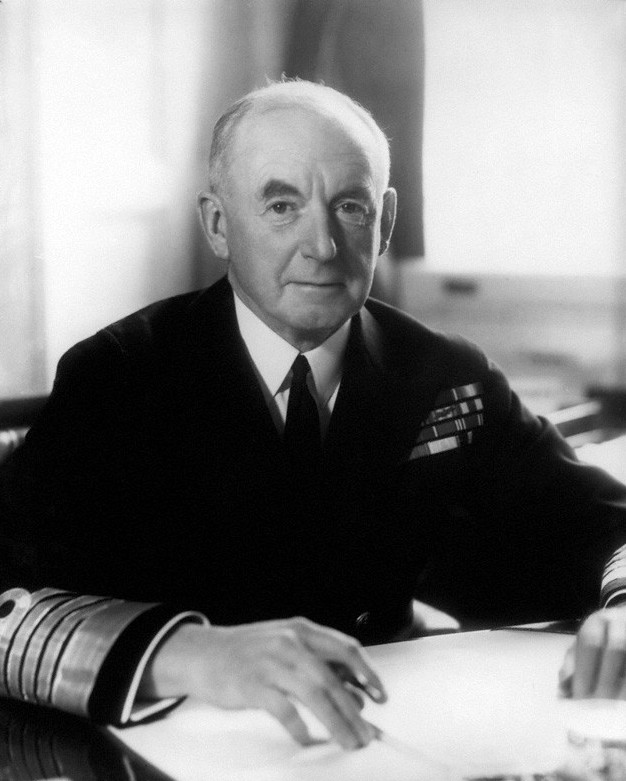
- Pound in 1939
- Born: Alfred Dudley Pickman Rogers Pound; 29 August 1877; Ventnor, Isle of Wight, England
- Died: 21 October 1943 (aged 66); London, England
- Military career
- Allegiance: United Kingdom
- Branch: Royal Navy
- Service years: 1891–1943
- Rank: Admiral of the Fleet
- Commands: First Sea Lord (1939–43); Mediterranean Fleet (1936–39); Battle Cruiser Squadron (1929–31); HMS Repulse (1920–22); HMS Colossus (1915–17)
- Conflicts: First World War; Arab revolt in Palestine; Second World War
- Awards: Knight Grand Cross of the Order of the Bath; Member of the Order of Merit; Knight Grand Cross of the Royal Victorian Order; Mentioned in Despatches; Officer of the Legion of Honour (France); Grand Cross of the Order of Polonia Restituta (Poland); Grand Cross of the Royal Norwegian Order of St Olav; Navy Distinguished Service Medal (United States)

Admiral of the Fleet Sir Alfred Dudley Pickman Rogers Pound GCB OM GCVO (29 August 1877 – 21 October 1943) was a British senior officer of the Royal Navy. He served in the First World War as a battleship commander, taking part in the Battle of Jutland with notable success, contributing to the sinking of the German cruiser Wiesbaden.

He served as First Sea Lord, the professional head of the Royal Navy, for the first four years of the Second World War. In that role his greatest achievement was his successful campaign against the German U-boats and the winning of the Battle of the Atlantic but his judgment has been questioned over the failed Norwegian Campaign in 1940, his dismissal of Admiral Dudley North in 1940, and his order in July 1942 to disperse Convoy PQ 17 and withdraw its covering forces. His fear of a possible (though never transpired) threat from heavy German surface ships, led to the convoy's destruction by submarines and aircraft, which other admirals deemed "a shameful page in naval history". His health failed in 1943 and he resigned, dying shortly thereafter.

== Early life ==
Born the son of Alfred John Pound, an Eton-educated barrister, by his marriage to Elizabeth Pickman Rogers, an American from Boston, Pound's maternal grandfather was Richard Saltonstall Rogers, but was also descended on his mother's side from Dudley Leavitt Pickman, an early Salem, Massachusetts, merchant. He was educated at Fonthill School in East Grinstead, Sussex.

== Early career ==
Pound joined the Royal Navy as a cadet in the training ship HMS Britannia in January 1891 and was posted as a midshipman to the battleship HMS Royal Sovereign in the Channel Squadron in January 1893. He transferred to the cruiser HMS Undaunted in May 1894 on the China Station and then joined HMS Calypso in the Training Squadron. Promoted to sub-lieutenant on 29 August 1896, he joined the destroyer HMS Opossum in October 1897 and the battleship HMS Magnificent in January 1898.

Promoted to lieutenant on 29 August 1898, he joined the torpedo school HMS Vernon in September 1899 and qualified as a torpedo specialist in December 1901. He served as a torpedo officer in the cruiser HMS Grafton on the Pacific Station before transferring to the battleship HMS King Edward VII in the Atlantic Fleet in January 1905 and then to the battleship HMS Queen in the Mediterranean Fleet in March 1907.

Pound joined the staff at the Ordnance Department of the Admiralty in January 1909 and then, having been promoted to commander on 30 June 1909, he transferred to the battleship HMS Superb in the Home Fleet in May 1911. He joined the staff of the Royal Naval War College in early 1913 and then transferred to the battleship HMS St Vincent in the Home Fleet in April 1914.

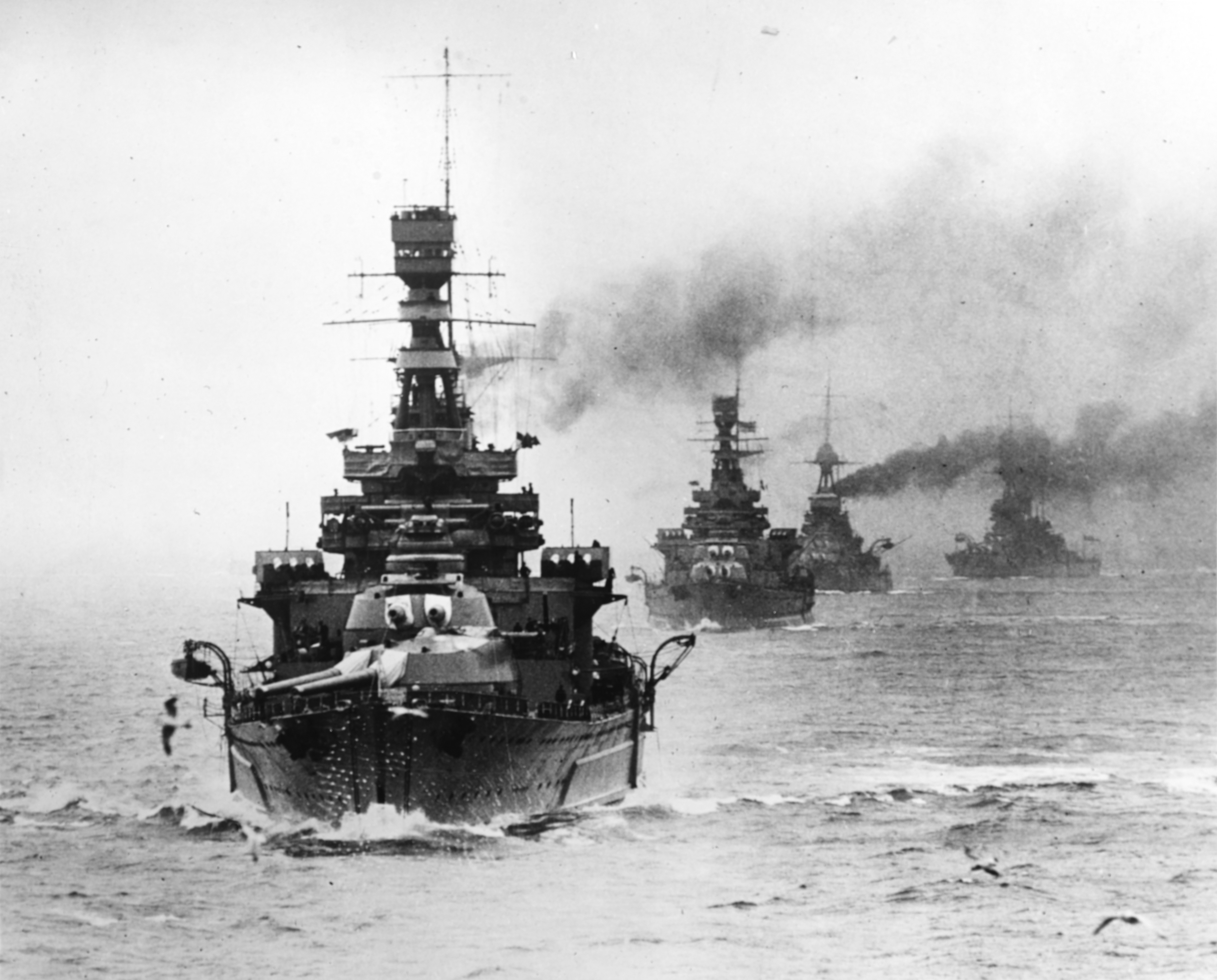
The battlecruiser HMS Repulse, which Pound commanded in the early 1920s

== First World War ==
Pound served throughout the First World War. After being promoted to captain on 31 December 1914, he became an Additional Naval Assistant to the First Sea Lord before being given command of the battleship HMS Colossus in May 1915. He led her at the Battle of Jutland with notable success, contributing to the sinking of the German cruiser Wiesbaden. He returned to the Admiralty in July 1917 to become assistant director of plans and then director of the operations division (home) and was closely involved in the planning for the Zeebrugge Raid. He also planned the use of radio remote controlled vessels that were developed by the Navy's D.C.B. Section.

== Interwar career ==
Pound was appointed a Companion of the Order of the Bath in the 1919 Birthday Honours and given command of the battlecruiser HMS Repulse in October 1920 before becoming director of the planning division at the Admiralty in June 1923. He became a Naval Aide-de-Camp to the King on 1 January 1925. Following Roger Keyes' appointment as commander-in-chief of the Mediterranean Fleet in May 1925, Pound became his chief of staff. Pound was promoted to rear admiral on 1 March 1926 and became Assistant Chief of the Naval Staff in April 1927. He went on to be Commander of the Battle Cruiser Squadron in May 1929 and, having been promoted to vice admiral on 15 May 1930, he became Second Sea Lord and Chief of Naval Personnel in August 1932. In the King's Birthday Honours 1930, Pound advanced to rank of Knight Commander of the Order of the Bath.

On 16 January 1933 Pound was promoted to full admiral he became Chief of Staff of the Mediterranean Fleet. In March 1936, he was appointed Commander-in-Chief, Mediterranean Fleet. On 20 May 1937 Pound was appointed as a Knight Grand Cross of the Royal Victorian Order. In the 1939 New Year Honours, Pound advanced to the rank of Knight Grand Cross of the Order of the Bath.

== First Sea Lord ==
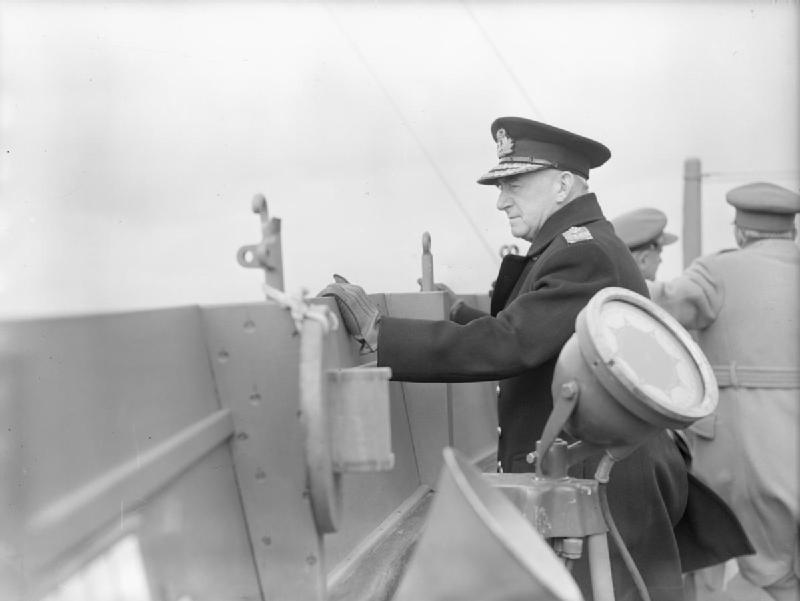
Pound on board the RMS Queen Mary sailing to the United States

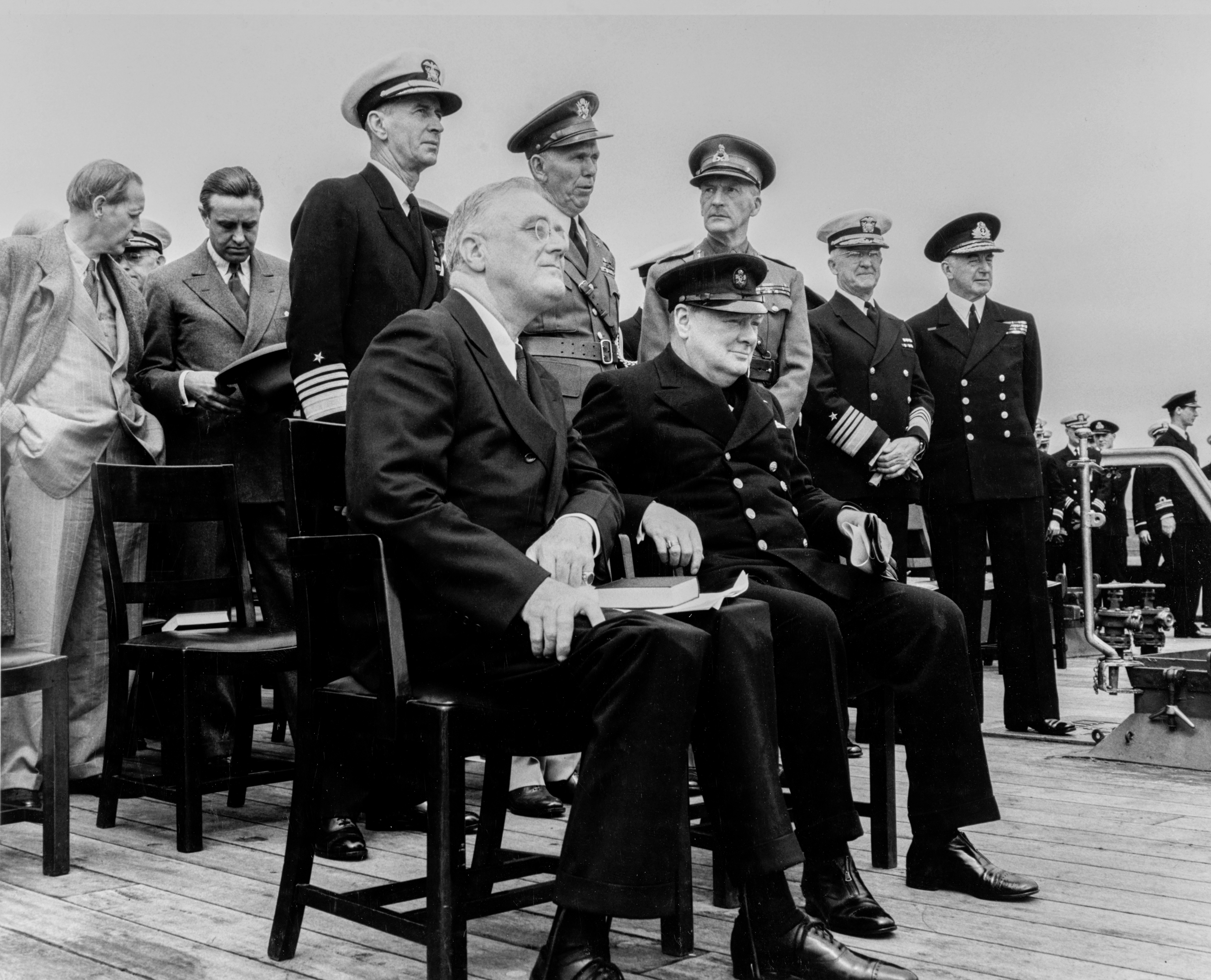
Admiral Pound (standing, far right) at the Atlantic Conference in 1941

Pound became First Sea Lord in June 1939 and was promoted to Admiral of the Fleet on 31 July 1939. His health was doubtful even then, but other experienced admirals were in even poorer health. He also became First and Principal Naval Aide-de-Camp to the King in October 1941.

There are sharply divided opinions of Pound as First Sea Lord during the early years of the Second World War. His admirals and captains at sea accused him of "back seat driving" and he had some clashes with Charles Forbes and John Tovey, commanders of the Home Fleet.

Winston Churchill, with whom he worked from September 1939, was involved with him on naval strategies such that he was referred to as "Churchill's anchor". He has also been described as a "cunning old badger" who had used guile to frustrate Churchill's Operation Catherine, a scheme to send a battle fleet into the Baltic, early in the war. Critically, Pound was at the helm of the Royal Navy on the day of the sinking of Prince of Wales and Repulse on 10 December 1941 off the coast of Kuantan, Malaysia by the Japanese Air Force.

Perhaps Pound's greatest achievement was his defeat of the German U-boats and the winning of the Battle of the Atlantic but he has been blamed for the Channel Dash when the Navy allowed the German battlecruisers Scharnhorst and Gneisenau to slip into the English Channel undetected in February 1942, and criticised for ordering the dispersal of Arctic Convoy PQ 17 in July 1942, in which 35 merchant ships were left without protection, leading to 24 of the 35 merchant ships being sunk with the loss of 153 men.

By March 1942 he was no longer Chairman of the Chiefs of Staff and accepted the need for a deputy first sea lord, with Admiral Sir Charles Kennedy-Purvis installed as such in July 1942.

Pound refused a peerage but was appointed to the Order of Merit on 3 September 1943, four years after the outbreak of the war.

== Resignation and death ==
Pound suffered from hip degeneration, the pain from which often disrupted his normal sleep and caused him to doze off at meetings. In July 1943 Pound's wife died; by this time it was clear that his health was declining. He had suffered one stroke, and the second, during the Quebec Conference the following month, was paralytic and indicative of a fast-developing brain tumour. Pound then resigned formally on 20 September 1943. He died from the tumour at the Royal Masonic Hospital in London on 21 October (Trafalgar Day) 1943 and, after a funeral service in Westminster Abbey, followed by cremation at Golders Green Crematorium, his ashes were buried at sea in The Solent.

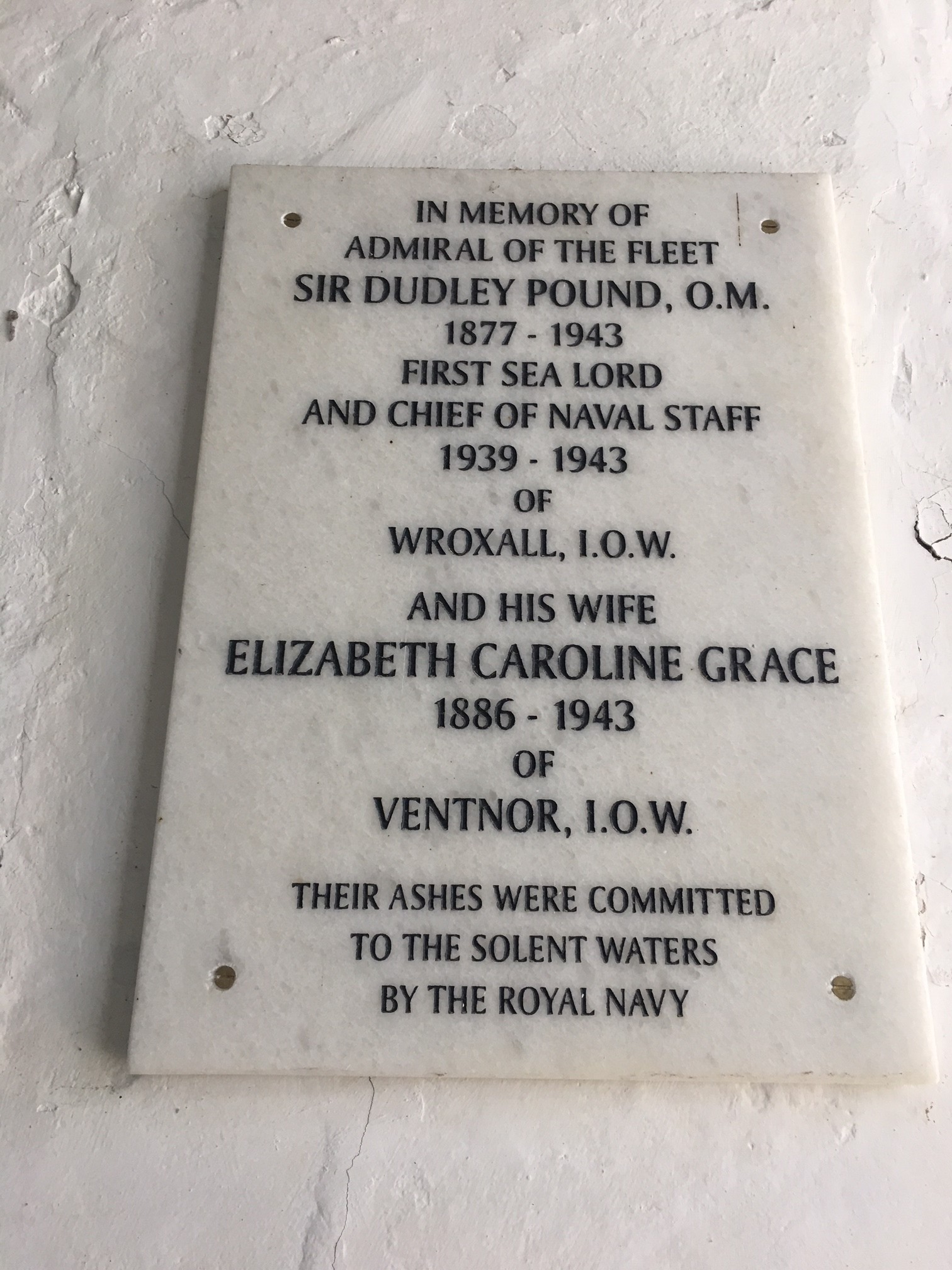
Dudley Pound memorial in All Saints' Church, Godshill, Isle of Wight

== Family ==
In 1908 Pound married Betty Whitehead; they had two sons and a daughter.

== Popular culture ==
In the 2024 movie The Ministry of Ungentlemanly Warfare a character named Admiral Pound is portrayed as being in favour of negotiating surrender with the Germans while being opposed to the Special Operations mission depicted.

== Sources ==
- Heathcote, Tony (2002). The British Admirals of the Fleet 1734 – 1995. Pen & Sword Ltd. ISBN 0-85052-835-6.
- Hurd, Duane Hamilton (1887). History of Essex County, Massachusetts. J. W. Lewis & Co., Philadelphia, Pennsylvania.
- Kennedy, Ludovic (1975). Pursuit: The Sinking of the Bismarck. Fontana Press. ISBN 978-0006340140.
- Nailor, Peter. "Great Chiefs of Staff – Admiral of the Fleet Sir Dudley Pound, OM, GCB GCVO", RUSI Journal: Royal United Services Institute for Defence Studies (1988) 133#1 pp 67–70.
- Stanley, Martin (2006). The Order of Merit. I.B. Tauris & Co. Ltd., London. ISBN 978-1860648489.

Military offices
Preceded by Sir Cyril Fuller	Second Sea Lord; 1932–1935	Succeeded by Sir Martin Dunbar-Nasmith
Preceded by Sir William Fisher	Commander-in-Chief, Mediterranean Fleet; 1936–1939	Succeeded by Sir Andrew Cunningham
Preceded by Sir Roger Backhouse	First Sea Lord; 1939–1943	Succeeded by Sir Andrew Cunningham
Honorary titles
Preceded by Hon. Sir Reginald Drax	First and Principal Naval Aide-de-Camp; 1941–1943	Succeeded by Sir Percy Noble
