= Walter Cowan =

Royal Navy Admiral; First and Principal Naval Aide-de-Camp to HM The King (1871–1956)

Admiral Sir Walter Cowan Bt KCB DSO* MVO
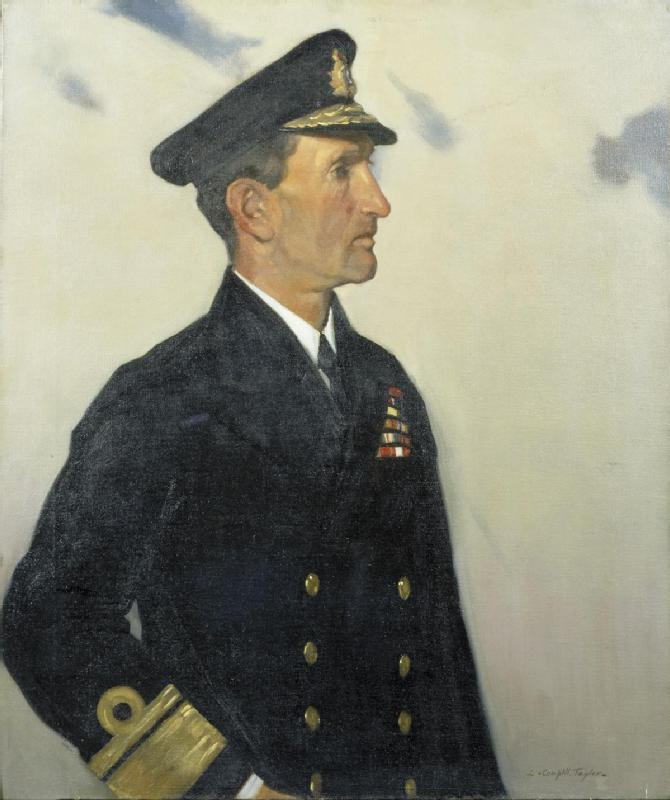
- Rear-Admiral Sir Walter Henry Cowan, 1920, by Leonard Campbell Taylor

First and Principal Naval Aide-de-Camp to HM The King
- In office 1930–1931

Commander-in-Chief, America and West Indies Station
- In office 1926–1928

Commander-in-Chief, Coast of Scotland
- In office 1925–1926

Rear-Admiral Commanding Battlecruiser Squadron
- In office 1921–1923

Commodore/Rear-Admiral Commanding 1st Light Cruiser Squadron
- In office June 1917 – 1920

Personal details
- Born: Walter Henry Cowan; 11 June 1871 Crickhowell, Brecknockshire, Wales
- Died: 14 February 1956 (aged 84)
- Awards: Knight Commander of the Order of the Bath; Distinguished Service Order & Bar; Member of the Royal Victorian Order; Mentioned in Despatches (3); Cross of Liberty (Estonia)
- Nickname: Tich

Military service
- Allegiance: United Kingdom
- Branch/service: Royal Navy; British Commandos
- Years of service: 1884–1931; 1941–1945
- Rank: Admiral
- Commands: America and West Indies Station (1926–28); Coast of Scotland (1925–26); Battlecruiser Squadron (1921–23); 1st Light Cruiser Squadron (1917–20); HMS Princess Royal (1915–17); HMS Zealandia (1914–15); HMS Gloucester (1910–12); HMS Cressy (1909–10); HMS Sapphire (1907–09); HMS Skirmisher (1905–07); HMS Falcon (1904–05)
- Battles/wars: Mahdist War; Second Boer War; First World War: Battle of Jutland; Second Battle of Heligoland Bight; Estonian War of Independence; Russian Civil War; Second World War

Admiral Sir Walter Henry Cowan, 1st Baronet, KCB, DSO & Bar, MVO (11 June 1871 – 14 February 1956), known as Tich Cowan, was a Royal Navy officer who saw service in both the First and Second World Wars; in the latter he was one of the oldest British servicemen on active duty.

== Early life ==
Cowan was born in Crickhowell, in Brecknockshire, Wales, on 11 June 1871, the eldest son of Walter Frederick James Cowan, an officer in the Royal Welch Fusiliers. After his father's retirement from the British Army, the family settled in Alveston, Warwickshire, where his father became a justice of the peace.

Cowan never went to school, but entered the Royal Navy in 1884 at the training ship, HMS Britannia, a classmate to fellow future admiral David Beatty.

== Early service career ==
In 1886, as midshipmen, Cowan and Beatty joined HMS Alexandra, flagship of the Mediterranean Fleet. Cowan saw service in Benin and Nigeria in 1887. He fell sick and was invalided home after less than a year, but later rejoined Alexandra, returning with her to Britain in 1889. He then joined HMS Volage in the Training Squadron and was commissioned as a sub-lieutenant in 1890. He was appointed to HMS Boadicea, flagship of the East India Station. In 1892 he was promoted lieutenant and became first lieutenant of the gunboat HMS Redbreast. However, in 1893 he was invalided home with dysentery.

In 1894, Cowan was appointed to the light cruiser HMS Barrosa off West Africa. During this time he participated in a number of expeditions against native and Arab insurgents. In 1898, he was appointed to the destroyer HMS Boxer in the Mediterranean, but only stayed in her for six months before being given command of the Nile gunboat HMS Sultan. He saw action in the Mahdist War, taking part in the Battle of Atbara and the Battle of Omdurman. He then commanded the entire Nile gunboat flotilla during the Fashoda Incident. He received the Distinguished Service Order for these actions.

Cowan then participated in the Second Boer War, acting as aide-de-camp to Lord Kitchener and then to Lord Roberts. Returning to England in 1901, Cowan was appointed first lieutenant of the battleship HMS Prince George. In June 1901 he was promoted commander at the early age of thirty, and in May the following year he was appointed to the battleship HMS Resolution, coast guard ship at Holyhead. He later took command of the destroyer HMS Falcon and acted as second-in-command of the Devonport destroyer flotilla under Roger Keyes, who was then developing new destroyer tactics. They became firm friends. Cowan commanded several more destroyers, acquiring a widespread reputation as a destroyer captain, and then succeeded Keyes in command of the flotilla. In 1904 he was appointed Member of the Royal Victorian Order. In 1905 he took command of HMS Skirmisher and he was promoted captain in 1906. He transferred to the cruiser HMS Sapphire in 1907. In 1908, he took command of all destroyers of the Channel Fleet. In 1909, he transferred to the Third Division of the Home Fleet with command of the nucleus-crewed HMS Cressy, and in 1910 he became captain of the new light cruiser HMS Gloucester. In 1912, Cowan became Assistant to John de Robeck, who was then Admiral of Patrols.

== First World War ==
In 1914, shortly before the outbreak of the First World War, Cowan was given command of the old pre-dreadnought HMS Zealandia. Six months later he took over the 26,270 ton HMS Princess Royal, as flag captain to Osmond Brock. He commanded her at the Battle of Jutland, where she was badly damaged. He was appointed a Companion of the Order of the Bath in 1916.

In June 1917 Cowan was made commodore of the 1st Light Cruiser Squadron, which he led at the Second Battle of Heligoland Bight on 17 November 1917. In 1918 he was promoted rear admiral, staying in command of the squadron.

== The Baltic ==
In January 1919 the 1st Light Cruiser Squadron was sent to the Baltic Sea. Cowan's mission was to keep the sea lanes open to the new republics of Finland, Latvia, Estonia and Lithuania, which were under threat of being overrun by Soviet Russia. The squadron support enabled them to secure their freedom. During the course of this campaign, coastal motor boats attached to Cowan's command sank one Bolshevik battleship and a cruiser at Kronstadt naval base. Augustus Agar received the Victoria Cross for his part in these events. Andrew Browne Cunningham, later Britain's leading Second World War admiral, commanded Cowan's destroyers in this campaign. Cowan's forceful diplomacy ensured a successful mission, for which he was advanced to Knight Commander of the Order of the Bath in 1919 and created a baronet, "of the Baltic", in the 1921 New Year Honours. He was awarded the Cross of Liberty (VR I/1) of Estonia.

== Between the wars ==
In 1921, Cowan was appointed to command the Battlecruiser Squadron, flying his flag in HMS Hood. He was unemployed from 1923 to 1925, although he was promoted vice admiral in 1923. In 1925 he was appointed Commander-in-Chief, Coast of Scotland and, in 1926, Commander-in-Chief, America and West Indies Station, holding the command until 1928, with his shore headquarters at Admiralty House Clarence Hill, across the mouth of the Great Sound from the station's base at the Royal Naval Dockyard in the Imperial fortress colony of Bermuda. He was promoted admiral in 1927. His final appointment was as First and Principal Naval Aide-de-Camp to the King in 1930. He retired in 1931.

== Second World War ==
During the Second World War, Cowan was given a job by his old friend Roger Keyes, then head of the Commandos. Cowan voluntarily took the lower rank of commander and went to Scotland in 1941 to train the newly formed corps in small boat handling. He managed to get himself sent to the North African theatre of operations with the Commandos. Shortly after arrival he saw action at the second Battle of Mechili in April 1941.

In May 1941, in his 72nd year, Cowan took part in two abortive seaborne raids with No. 8 (Guards) Commando involving an expedition along the North Egyptian and Cyrenaica coast aboard HMS Aphis, a river gun-boat from the China Station with a top speed of 12 knots. The expeditions were repeatedly attacked from the air over several days by Axis forces before being constrained to abandon the endeavour on the second attempt through battle damage to the boat's rudder mechanism, which limited it to going around in circles in repetition. During the incessant attacks, with scores of bombs splashing into the sea about the vessel, Cowan (believed by the commandos in whose midst he was, to be seeking a heroic death in action) was regularly to be seen on the deck blazing away at the oncoming hostile aircraft with a Tommy Gun.

Cowan also saw action at the Battle of Bir Hakeim, where, having attached himself to the Indian 18th King Edward VII's Own Cavalry, he was captured on 27 May 1942, having fought an Italian tank crew single-handedly armed only with a revolver. He was repatriated in 1943 under an agreement with Italy whereby some 800 Italian seamen interned in neutral Saudi Arabia from the Red Sea Flotilla were exchanged for a similar number of British prisoners of war. An unusual feature was that there was no stipulation about the men's future activities and they were free to return to action. Cowan rejoined the commandos and saw action again in Italy during 1944. He was awarded a Bar to his Distinguished Service Order for "gallantry, determination and undaunted devotion to duty as Liaison Officer with Commandos in the attack and capture of Mount Ornito, Italy and during attacks on the islands of Solta, Mljet and Brac in the Adriatic, all of which operations were carried out under very heavy fire from the enemy".

Cowan retired once more in 1945. After the war he was invited to become the honorary colonel of the 18th King Edward's Own Cavalry, and visited India to receive the post, which he considered the greatest he had attained in his extensive military career.

== Death and tribute ==
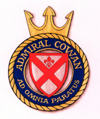
Crest of the Estonian ship Admiral Cowan

Cowan died on 14 February 1956, in his 85th year. The Cowan Baronetcy became extinct on his death.

Escutcheon of the Cowan baronets of the Baltic

In 2007 the Estonian Navy named a British-made minehunter of the Sandown class the Admiral Cowan. The ship's crest is based on Cowan's family arms. Memorials in the Estonian capital Tallinn, in the Latvian capital Riga and in Portsmouth Cathedral commemorate the 110 men of the Royal Navy and Royal Air Force killed in the Baltic action of 1919.

== Footnotes ==
Military offices
Preceded by Sir Roger Keyes	Commander, Battlecruiser Squadron; 1921–1923	Succeeded by Sir Frederick Field
Preceded by Sir Reginald Tyrwhitt	Commander-in-Chief, Coast of Scotland; 1925–1926	Succeeded by Humphrey Bowring
Preceded by Sir James Fergusson	Commander-in-Chief, America and West Indies Station; 1926–1928	Succeeded by Sir Cyril Fuller
Honorary titles
Preceded by Sir Edwyn Alexander-Sinclair	First and Principal Naval Aide-de-Camp; 1930–1931	Succeeded by Sir Hubert Brand
Baronetage of the United Kingdom
New creation	Baronet (of the Baltic and Bilton); 1921–1956	Extinct
