= Lancelot Holland =

Royal Navy admiral (1887–1941)

Vice-Admiral Lancelot Holland CB
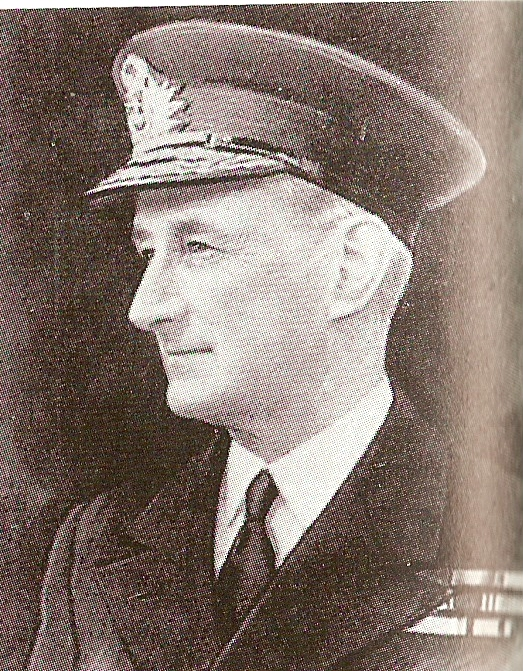
- Born: 13 September 1887; Middleton Cheney, Banbury, England
- Died: 24 May 1941 (aged 53); HMS Hood, Denmark Strait
- Military career
- Allegiance: United Kingdom
- Branch: Royal Navy
- Service years: 1902–1941
- Rank: Vice-Admiral
- Commands: Battlecruiser Squadron (1941); 18th Cruiser Squadron (1940–41); 3rd Battle Squadron (1939–40); Channel Force (1939); 2nd Battle Squadron (1939); Royal Naval Barracks, Portsmouth (1936–37); HMS Revenge (1934–35); HMS Hawkins (1929–31); HMS Vindictive (1929); HMS Kite (1916–18)
- Conflicts: First World War; Second World War; Battle of the Mediterranean; Battle of Cape Spartivento; Battle of the Atlantic; Operation Rheinübung; Battle of the Denmark Strait †
- Awards: Companion of the Order of the Bath; Mentioned in Despatches; Commander of the Order of the Redeemer (Greece)

Vice-Admiral Lancelot Ernest Holland, CB (13 September 1887 – 24 May 1941) was a Royal Navy officer who commanded the British force in the Battle of the Denmark Strait in May 1941 against the German battleship Bismarck. Holland was lost when he stayed at his post during the sinking of HMS Hood.

== Early life and early naval career ==
Lancelot Holland was one of six sons and a daughter of a doctor who was also a brewer for the firm Hunt Edmunds. He was born in Middleton Cheney and was raised in the Banbury area. He entered the Royal Navy on 15 May 1902, at age 14. On leaving HMS Britannia in September 1903, he was drafted to the China Station to join HMS Eclipse. He served in the Far East until August 1905. The latter part of his time there was spent in HMS Hampshire.

Returning home, Holland saw brief service during the summer of 1908 in the Admiralty surveying ship HMS Research. However, the surveying service proved not to be Holland's forte and three years later on 14 September 1911 the young Lieutenant Holland joined HMS Excellent, the Royal Navy's gunnery school at Whale Island, Portsmouth to start the 'Long Course' which would qualify him as a lieutenant (G).

Having qualified as a gunnery lieutenant and gone on to take the advanced gunnery course at Greenwich, Holland spent the First World War in a teaching role aboard HMS Excellent. After the war he was promoted to commander on 31 December 1919 and captain on 30 June 1926.

During the period May 1929 to February 1931, Holland was flag captain to the 2nd Cruiser Squadron, aboard HMS Hawkins. From May 1931 to September 1932, Holland headed the British Naval Mission to Greece. He was subsequently flag captain aboard the battleship HMS Revenge from July 1934 to July 1935.

== Senior officer ==
After a stint as naval aide-de-camp to King George VI in 1937, Holland became Assistant Chief of Naval Staff and then, following promotion to rear admiral, commander of the 2nd Battle Squadron in January 1939. In September, following the outbreak of the Second World War, he was appointed Rear Admiral Commanding, Channel Force. He then became Admiralty representative at the Air Ministry. He was promoted to vice-admiral, backdated to August 1940, after commanding Cruiser Force H during the Battle of Cape Spartivento on 27 November.

== Second World War ==
From November 1940, Holland commanded the 18th Cruiser Squadron, serving in the Mediterranean. During the course of this command he led his cruisers in the Battle of Cape Spartivento on 27 November 1940. By this time, Holland had established himself as a gunnery specialist.

=== North Atlantic and death ===
Holland's next assignment was in command of the Battlecruiser Squadron. In May 1941, the new German battleship Bismarck attempted to break out into the North Atlantic, accompanied by the heavy cruiser Prinz Eugen. Their mission was to attack Allied convoys. Holland flew his flag aboard Hood, which was accompanied by the new battleship HMS Prince of Wales. On 22 May, just after midnight, Electra, Achates, Antelope, Anthony, Echo, and Icarus, escorting the Hood and Prince Of Wales, sailed to cover the northern approaches. The intention was that the force would refuel in Hvalfjord, Iceland, and then sail again to watch the Denmark Strait. On the evening of 23 May, the weather deteriorated. At 20:55, Admiral Holland aboard the Hood signalled the destroyers "If you are unable to maintain this speed I will have to go on without you. You should follow at your best speed." At 02:15 on the morning of 24 May, the destroyers were ordered to spread out at 15-mile (24 km) intervals to search to the north.

At about 05:35, the German forces were sighted by the Hood and, shortly afterwards, the Germans sighted the British ships. In the ensuing Battle of the Denmark Strait the Hood suffered a catastrophic magazine explosion at 06:01 that broke the ship in half; the admiral and all but three of the crew of 1,418 were lost. One of the survivors, Ted Briggs, later stated he last saw Holland sitting in his admiral's chair, in utter dejection, making no attempt to escape from the sinking wreck.

Prince of Wales made her escape with some damage, including a hit on her bridge which killed many of her officers. One of the salvos from Prince of Wales damaged Bismarck's fuel tanks, and prompted her to make for occupied France.

Holland was posthumously Mentioned in Despatches.

== Family ==
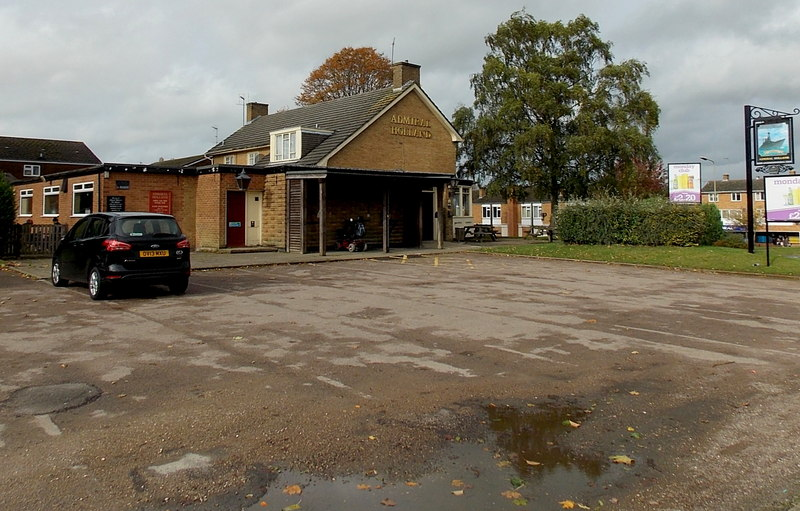
The Admiral Holland public house, Banbury

Holland was married to Phyllis and had one son, John, who died of polio at the age of 18 in 1936.

Holland and his family attended the Anglican parish Church of St John the Baptist at Boldre in the New Forest, Hampshire. They had a memorial to their son installed there and later a Hood Memorial Chapel was dedicated. An annual memorial service is held to remember Admiral Holland and the crew of Hood. A public house in Banbury, the Admiral Holland, was named after him. This pub was demolished in May 2017.

== Bibliography ==
- Pursuit: The Sinking of the Bismarck, Ludovic Kennedy. Collins/Fontana, Glasgow, 1975
- The Mighty Hood, Ernle Bradford. Coronet Books (Hodder and Stoughton), Sevenoaks, Kent, England, 1961

Military offices
Preceded by Sir William Whitworth	Commander, Battlecruiser Squadron; 1941	Squadron disbanded
