= Wilfred Tomkinson =

Vice-Admiral Wilfred Tomkinson CB MVO
- Born: 15 November 1877
- Died: 7 October 1971 (aged 93)
- Military career
- Allegiance: United Kingdom
- Branch: Royal Navy
- Service years: 1891–1942
- Rank: Vice-Admiral
- Commands: Battlecruiser Squadron (1931–34); HMS Hood (1920–21); HMS Lion (1919–20); 6th Destroyer Flotilla (1918–19); HMS Colossus (1917); HMS Aurora (1916–17); HMS Lurcher (1914–15); HMS Forth (1912–14)
- Conflicts: Boxer Rebellion; First World War: Battle of Heligoland Bight; Battle of Dogger Bank; Zeebrugge Raid; First Ostend Raid; Second World War
- Awards: Companion of the Order of the Bath; Member of the Royal Victorian Order

Vice-Admiral Wilfred Tomkinson, CB, MVO (15 November 1877 – 7 October 1971) was a Royal Navy officer who served as commander of the Battlecruiser Squadron from 1931 to 1934.

== Naval career ==
Tomkinson joined the Royal Navy in 1891 and served in the destroyer HMS Fame during the Boxer Rebellion in 1900. He served in the First World War, initially commanding the destroyer HMS Lurcher and seeing action at the Battle of Heligoland Bight in 1914 and the Battle of Dogger Bank in 1915; his war service continued as Senior Naval Officer, British submarines in Venice in 1915 and as commander of the light cruiser HMS Aurora in 1916 before seeing action again during the Zeebrugge Raid and the Ostend Raid in 1918.

Tomkinson became the first commanding officer of the newly-commissioned battlecruiser HMS Hood in 1919, Chief of Staff at the Nore in 1921 and Director of Naval Operations at the Admiralty in 1923. He went on to be Commodore at Royal Naval Barracks, Devonport in 1925, Chief of Staff to the Commander-in-Chief, Mediterranean Fleet in 1927 and Assistant Chief of the Naval Staff in 1929. He then became commander of the Battlecruiser Squadron in 1931 before being placed in temporary command of the Atlantic Fleet later that year; it was under his command that the Invergordon Mutiny took place and, following the conclusion of the mutiny, he was blamed for being too lenient with the mutineers and placed on half pay. He retired in 1935, but was re-employed during the Second World War as Flag Officer in charge of the Bristol Channel before retiring again in 1942.

Military offices
Preceded by Sir Frederic Dreyer	Commander, Battlecruiser Squadron; 1929–1932	Succeeded by Sir William James
