= Michael Hodges (Royal Navy officer) =

Royal Navy Admiral and Second Sea Lord (1874–1951)

Admiral Sir Michael Hodges KCB CMG MVO
- Born: 29 September 1874
- Died: 3 November 1951 (aged 77)
- Military career
- Allegiance: United Kingdom
- Branch: Royal Navy
- Service years: 1887–1945
- Rank: Admiral
- Commands: HMS Sappho; HMS Indomitable; HMS Renown; Atlantic Fleet
- Conflicts: Second Boer War; World War I World War II
- Awards: Knight Commander of the Order of the Bath; Companion of the Order of St Michael and St George; Member of the Royal Victorian Order

Admiral Sir Michael Henry Hodges, KCB, CMG, MVO (29 September 1874 – 3 November 1951) was a senior Royal Navy officer who went on to be Second Sea Lord and Chief of Naval Personnel.

== Naval career ==
Hodges joined the Royal Navy as a cadet in the training ship HMS Britannia in 1887. In late 1899, during the Second Boer War, he was landed in South Africa as a member of HMS Powerful's naval brigade and sent to defend the town of Ladysmith. He was appointed in command of the destroyer HMS Flirt on 18 September 1900, when she served in the Portsmouth instructional flotilla, and left her on 8 January 1901 to take command of the destroyer HMS Crane, which replaced Flirt in the flotilla. He was promoted to commander on 26 June 1902, and the following day posted to HMS Duke of Wellington as flag officer to the Board of Admiralty during the coronation fleet review, but the appointment was later cancelled when the coronation was postponed. When the review was rescheduled for 16 August 1902, he was posted to HMS Enchantress, yacht to the Lords of the Admiralty, for two weeks during the review. In late September that year, he was appointed to the President for study at the Royal Naval College. He was appointed in command of the cruiser HMS Sappho in 1905 and despatched to South Georgia to investigate the emerging whaling industry there. In 1912 he became Naval Attaché in Paris.

In World War I he commanded the battlecruiser HMS Indomitable and then the new battlecruiser HMS Renown. In 1918 he was appointed chief of staff to the Second in Command of the Grand Fleet.

After the War he was made Rear Admiral Commanding the Destroyer Flotillas of the Atlantic Fleet. He became Naval Secretary in 1923, Commander of the 3rd Battle Squadron in April 1925 and Commander of the 1st Battle Squadron and Second in Command of the Mediterranean Fleet in March 1926. He was Second Sea Lord and Chief of Naval Personnel from 1927 to 1930 when, having been promoted to full admiral in 1929, he was appointed Commander-in-Chief, Atlantic Fleet in 1930. It was at this time that the Invergordon Mutiny took place when sailors of the Atlantic Fleet rioted over pay although Hodges was in the Royal Hospital Haslar at Gosport and therefore not directly involved in resolving the crisis. He was relieved due to pleurisy and retired in 1932. During World War II he was re-employed as Flag Officer in Charge in Trinidad, West Indies.

In retirement he became Chairman of the Shipwrecked Fishermen and Mariners Royal Benevolent Society.

== Honours ==
Hodges was appointed a Member (4th class) of the Royal Victorian Order (MVO) in 1914 on the occasion of the King's visit to Paris.. He was appointed a Companion of the Order of the Bath (CB) in the 1919 New Year Honours, and promoted to Knight Commander of the Order (KCB) in the 1925 Birthday Honours. He was appointed a Companion of the Order of St Michael and St George (CMG) in 1919 "for valuable services as Naval Attache, Paris, and as Divisional Naval Transport Officer, Salonika."

== Family ==
In 1903 he married Frederica Rika Octavia Tiarks; they went on to have four sons and one daughter.

Military offices
| Preceded by Hugh Watson | Naval Secretary; 1923–1925 | Succeeded by Hubert Brand |
| Preceded by Sir Hubert Brand | Second Sea Lord; 1927–1930 | Succeeded by Sir Cyril Fuller |
| Preceded by Sir Ernle Chatfield | Commander-in-Chief, Atlantic Fleet; 1930–1931 | Succeeded by Sir John Kelly |
