= Cyril Fuller =

Royal Navy Admiral (1874–1942)

Admiral Sir Cyril Fuller KCB CMG DSO
- Born: 22 May 1874; Isle of Wight, Hampshire, England
- Died: 1 February 1942 (aged 67); Long Buckby, Daventry, Northamptonshire, England
- Military career
- Allegiance: United Kingdom
- Branch: Royal Navy
- Service years: 1887–1935
- Rank: Admiral
- Commands: Second Sea Lord (1930–1932); America and West Indies Station (1928–1930); Battlecruiser Squadron (1925–1927); HMS Repulse (1916–1917); HMS Astraea (1915–1916); HMS Challenger (1914–1915); HMS Cumberland (1914); HMS Alacrity (1908–1910)
- Conflicts: First World War; Second World War
- Awards: Knight Commander of the Order of the Bath; Companion of the Order of St Michael and St George; Distinguished Service Order; Mentioned in Despatches

Admiral Sir Cyril Thomas Moulden Fuller, KCB, CMG, DSO (22 May 1874 – 1 February 1942) was a Royal Navy officer who served as Second Sea Lord and Chief of Naval Personnel from 1930 to 1932.

== Early life ==
Fuller was born in the Isle of Wight on 22 May 1874, the son of Captain Thomas Fuller of the British Army. He joined the Britannia Royal Naval College as a cadet in 1887.

== Naval career ==
Fuller was promoted to lieutenant in 1894, and to commander in 1904. Fuller served in the First World War as Senior Naval Officer for the Togoland and Cameroons expedition forces in 1914 and then successively commanded the cruisers HMS Cumberland, HMS Challenger and HMS Astraea. He was appointed a Companion of the Order of St Michael and St George in the 1915 New Year Honours for services in connection with military operations. He commanded the battlecruiser HMS Repulse from 1916 and then became Director of Naval Plans at the Admiralty in 1917. He was appointed a Companion of the Distinguished Service Order in 1916 in recognition of his service during naval operations in the Cameroons. He was Head of the British Naval Section at the Peace Conference in Paris in 1919. He was appointed a Companion of the Order of the Bath in 1919 for his services at the Peace Conference.

After the war, Fuller became Chief of Staff for the Atlantic Fleet in 1920 and Assistant Chief of the Naval Staff in 1922. He was made Third Sea Lord and Controller of the Navy in 1923 and given command of the Battlecruiser Squadron in 1925. He was appointed Commander-in-Chief of the America and West Indies Station in 1928 and Second Sea Lord and Chief of Naval Personnel in 1930. He was promoted to Knight Commander of the Order of the Bath (KCB) in the 1928 Birthday Honours. He retired in 1935.

During the Second World War, Fuller was Zone commander for the North Riding of Yorkshire Home Guard.

== Family ==
In 1902 Fuller married Edith Margaret Connell.

Military offices
Preceded by Sir Frederick Field	Third Sea Lord and Controller of the Navy; 1923–1925	Succeeded by Sir Ernle Chatfield
Preceded by Sir Frederick Field	Commander, Battlecruiser Squadron; 1925–1927	Succeeded by Sir Frederic Dreyer
Preceded by Sir Walter Cowan	Commander-in-Chief, America and West Indies Station; 1928–1930	Succeeded by Sir Vernon Haggard
Preceded by Sir Michael Hodges	Second Sea Lord; 1930–1932	Succeeded by Sir Dudley Pound
