= Channel Force =

- Active: 1939
- Country: United Kingdom
- Allegiance: British Empire
- Branch: Royal Navy

Commanders
- Notable commanders: Lancelot Holland

The Channel Force was a temporary squadron of the British Royal Navy during the Second World War that was based at Portland, England from September to October 1939.

It was under the command of Rear-Admiral Lancelot Holland throughout the period.

== History ==
The Channel Force was a powerful squadron established at Portland on 3 September 1939 to deal with any attempt by the Germans to operate light forces in the southern part of the North Sea, certain cruisers and destroyers were detached from the Home Fleet to be based on the Humber. It was under direct operational control by the Admiralty until 7 October 1939 when it was dispersed.

The force was formed with ships from both Commander-in-Chief, Portsmouth and Commander-in-Chief, Plymouth.

== Components ==
Components of the force included:

| | Unit | Date | Notes |
|---|---|---|---|
| 1 | 3rd Battle Squadron | 3 September - 7 October 1939 | 2 battleships |
| 2 | Aircraft Carriers | 3 September - 7 October 1939 | 2 aircraft carriers, HMS Hermes - HMS Courageous, |
| 3 | Cruisers | 3 September - 7 October 1939 | 2 CL, HMS Ceres, HMS Caradoc - 1 CAA, HMS Cairo |
| 4 | 12th Destroyer Flotilla | 3 September - 7 October 1939 | 10 destroyers |
| 5 | 18th Destroyer Flotilla | 3 September - 7 October 1939 | 2 Destroyer Divisions 35 and 36 |
