= William Whitworth (Royal Navy officer) =

Royal Navy Admiral (1884–1973)

Admiral Sir William Whitworth KCB DSO
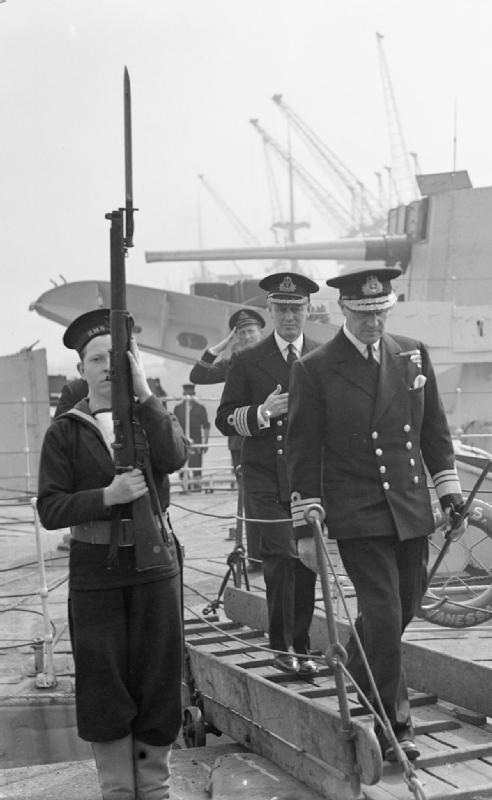
- Vice Admiral Whitworth coming ashore after inspecting HMS Vanessa at the port of Liverpool
- Born: 29 June 1884; Chatham, Kent
- Died: 25 October 1973 (aged 89); Bognor Regis, West Sussex
- Military career
- Allegiance: United Kingdom
- Branch: Royal Navy
- Service years: 1899–1946
- Rank: Admiral
- Commands: Rosyth (1944–46); Second Sea Lord (1941–44); Battlecruiser Squadron (1939–41); HMS Rodney (1936); 2nd Destroyer Flotilla (1928–31); HMS Stuart (1928–31); HMS Valkyrie (1924–25); HMS Wryneck (1923–24)
- Conflicts: First World War; Second World War
- Awards: Knight Commander of the Order of the Bath; Distinguished Service Order; Mentioned in Despatches; Order of St. Olav (Norway)

Admiral Sir William Jock Whitworth (29 June 1884 – 25 October 1973) was a senior Royal Navy officer who served as Second Sea Lord and Chief of Naval Personnel from 1941 to 1944.

== Naval career ==
Whitworth joined the Royal Navy as a cadet in 1899. On 15 January 1901 he posted to the battleship HMS Ocean, as she was sent to the China station during the Boxer Rebellion.

He served in the First World War, commanding the destroyers HMS Cockatrice, HMS Orestes and HMS Vidette. He then became commanding officer at the Physical and Recreational Training School in Portsmouth in 1926. He was given command of HMS Stuart and the 2nd Destroyer Flotilla of the Mediterranean Fleet in 1928.

In 1933 Whitworth was appointed captain of the fleet to the Commander-in-Chief, Mediterranean Fleet, and in 1936 he took command of the battleship HMS Rodney. He was made Naval Secretary in 1937.

Whitworth served in the Second World War and commanded the Battlecruiser Squadron in 1939. He participated in the Norwegian Campaign and in 1940, with his flag flying in the battleship HMS Warspite, he led the Royal Navy to victory at the second Battle of Narvik off Norway. Later in 1940 he returned to the battlecruiser squadron and spent time on HMS Hood. He was made Second Sea Lord and Chief of Naval Personnel in 1941 and Commander-in-Chief, Rosyth in 1944. He retired in 1946.

== Family ==
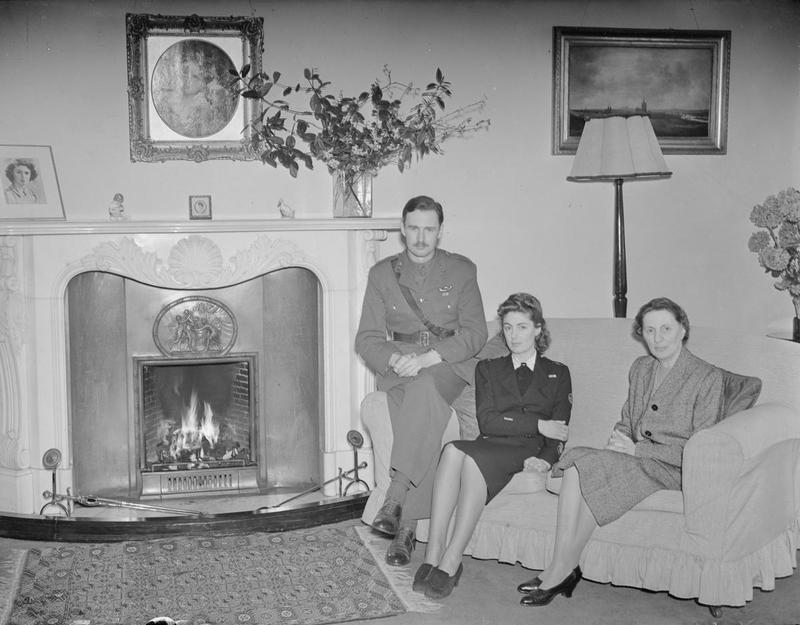
Whitworth's wife, daughter and daughter's fiancé in March 1945

In 1910 Whitworth married Marguerite MacLean.

Military offices
Preceded by Guy Royle	Naval Secretary; 1937–1939	Succeeded by Stuart Bonham Carter
Preceded by Sir Geoffrey Layton	Commander, Battlecruiser Squadron; 1939–1940	Succeeded by Sir James Somerville
Preceded by Sir James Somerville	Commander, Battlecruiser Squadron; 1940–1941	Succeeded by Lancelot Holland
Preceded by Sir Charles Little	Second Sea Lord; 1941–1944	Succeeded by Sir Algernon Willis
Preceded by Wilbraham Ford	Commander-in-Chief, Rosyth; 1944–1946	Succeeded by Last holder of post (replaced by Flag Officer Scotland and Northern Ireland; Frederick Dalrymple-Hamilton)
