= Hubert Brand =

Royal Navy Admiral and Second Sea Lord (1870–1955)

Admiral The Honourable Sir Hubert Brand GCB KCMG KCVO
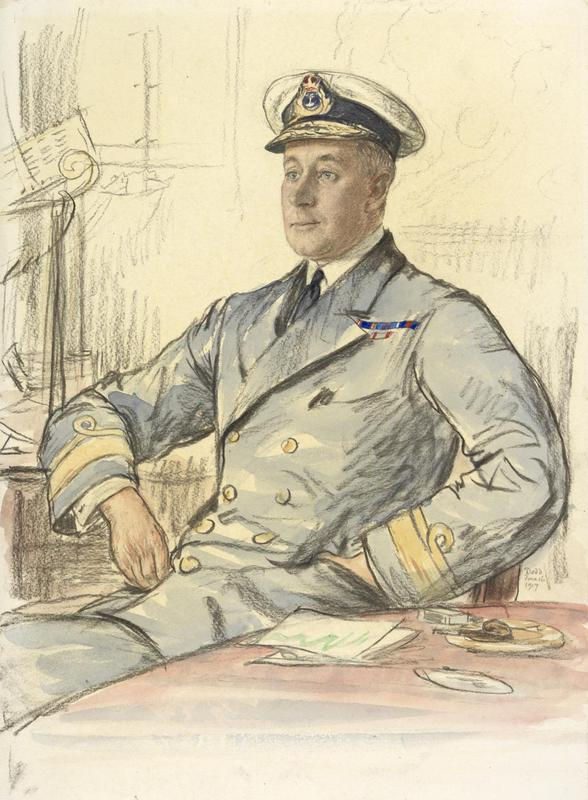
- 1917 portrait by Francis Dodd
- Born: 20 May 1870
- Died: 14 December 1955 (aged 85)
- Military career
- Allegiance: United Kingdom
- Branch: Royal Navy
- Service years: 1883–1932
- Rank: Admiral
- Commands: Flag Officer, Royal Yachts; Atlantic Fleet; Plymouth Command
- Conflicts: World War I
- Awards: Knight Grand Cross of the Order of the Bath; Knight Commander of the Order of St Michael and St George; Knight Commander of the Royal Victorian Order

Admiral Sir Hubert George Brand, GCB, KCMG, KCVO (20 May 1870 – 14 December 1955) was a senior Royal Navy officer who served as Second Sea Lord and Chief of Naval Personnel.

== Background ==
Brand was the second son of Henry Brand, 2nd Viscount Hampden, Governor of New South Wales, and the grandson of Henry Brand, 1st Viscount Hampden, Speaker of the House of Commons. His mother was Susan Henrietta Cavendish, daughter of Lord George Cavendish. His three surviving brothers also gained distinction: Thomas Brand, 3rd Viscount Hampden, and the Honourable Roger Brand were both Brigadier-Generals in the Army while the Honourable Robert Brand was a businessman and civil servant who was raised to the peerage as Baron Brand in 1946.

== Naval career ==
Brand joined the Royal Navy in 1883. Appointed acting Sub-Lieutenant on 14 September 1889, he was confirmed in this rank in June 1891, and promoted to Lieutenant on 30 June 1892. He was promoted to Commander on 1 September 1902, and appointed in command of the destroyer HMS Success on 20 December 1902, but transferred to take command of HMS Arab on her first commission only three weeks later, as she succeeded the Success as senior officer′s ship in the Portsmouth instructional flotilla on 12 January 1903.

He was appointed Naval Attaché in Tokyo in 1912. He served in World War I as Naval Assistant to the Second Sea Lord and then as chief of staff to the Vice-Admiral commanding the Battle Cruiser Fleet in 1916. On 26 June 1919, he was appointed a deputy lieutenant of Hertfordshire. After the war he became commander of the King's Yachts from 1919 and then commanded the 1st Light Cruiser Squadron from 1922 before becoming Naval Secretary in 1925. He went on to be Second Sea Lord and Chief of Naval Personnel later that year. He was made Commander-in-Chief, Atlantic Fleet in 1927 and Commander-in-Chief, Plymouth in 1929. He was also appointed First and Principal Naval Aide-de-Camp to the King in 1931; He retired in 1932.

== Honours ==
Brand was appointed a Companion of the Order of the Bath (CB) in the 1918 Birthday Honours, and promoted to Knight Commander of the Order (KCB) in the 1927 Birthday Honours.

Brand was appointed a Knight Commander of the Royal Victorian Order (KCVO) in the 1922 New Year Honours.

== Family ==
Brand married Norah Greene, daughter of Sir Conyngham Greene, British Ambassador to Japan, in 1914. They had two daughters, of whom only the eldest reached adulthood. Norah died in March 1924. Brand remained a widower until his death in December 1955, aged 85.

Military offices
Preceded by Michael Hodges	Naval Secretary; April 1925–April 1925	Succeeded by Frank Larken
Preceded by Sir Michael Culme-Seymour, Bt	Second Sea Lord; 1925–1927	Succeeded by Sir Michael Hodges
Preceded by Sir Henry Oliver	Commander-in-Chief, Atlantic Fleet; 1927–1929	Succeeded by Sir Ernle Chatfield
Preceded by Sir Rudolph Bentinck	Commander-in-Chief, Plymouth; 1929–1932	Succeeded by Sir Eric Fullerton
Honorary titles
Preceded by Sir Walter Cowan	First and Principal Naval Aide-de-Camp; 1931–1932	Succeeded by Sir Reginald Tyrwhitt, Bt
Preceded by Sir Montague Browning	Rear-Admiral of the United Kingdom; 1939–1945	Succeeded by Sir Percy Noble
