= Sir John Cowan, 1st Baronet, of London =

English politician

Sir John Cowan Bt
- Born: 1774
- Died: 22 October 1842 (aged 68); Forest Hill, south London
- Burial place: West Norwood Cemetery
- Occupation: prosperous London chandler
- Known for: Lord Mayor of London (1837–38)
- Spouse: Sophia Mullett

Sir John Cowan, 1st Baronet (1774 – 22 October 1842) was a London chandler and Lord Mayor of London.

An alderman of Broad St Ward from 1831, he was also appointed Sheriff of the City of London for 1831 and elected Lord Mayor for 1837–38. In his year as Lord Mayor he hosted a visit of Queen Victoria to London and was made a baronet on 9 November 1837 in thanks.

He married Sophia, the daughter of James Mullett; they had no children. He died at his home in Forest Hill, south London on 22 October 1842, aged 68, and was buried in the catacombs of West Norwood Cemetery.

Baronetage of the United Kingdom
New creation	Baronet (of London); 1837–1842	Extinct
