= Cowan baronets =

Set index for Cowan baronets

There have been three baronetcies created for persons with the surname Cowan, all in the Baronetage of the United Kingdom. All three creations are extinct.

- Cowan baronets of London (1837): see Sir John Cowan, 1st Baronet (1774–1842)
- Cowan baronets of Beeslack (1894): see Sir John Cowan, 1st Baronet (1814–1900)
- Cowan baronets of the Baltic and Bilton (1921): see Sir Walter Henry Cowan, 1st Baronet (1871–1956)
