= Battlecruiser Squadron =

Former battlecruiser formation of the Royal Navy

- White Ensign
- Active: 1919–1941
- Country: United Kingdom
- Allegiance: British Empire
- Branch: Royal Navy
- Type: Naval squadron
- Engagements: Battle of the Denmark Strait

Commanders
- Notable commanders: Lancelot E. Holland, CB

The Battlecruiser Squadron was a Royal Navy squadron of battlecruisers that saw service from 1919 to the early part of the Second World War. Its best-known constituent ship was HMS Hood, "The Mighty Hood", which was lost in the Battle of the Denmark Strait on 24 May 1941. Following the loss of HMS Repulse on 10 December 1941, Battlecruiser Squadron was disbanded. Its last surviving member, HMS Renown, survived World War II and was removed from service and scrapped in 1948.

== Formation ==
During the First World War, the Royal Navy had initially maintained three squadrons of battlecruisers, until losses at the Battle of Jutland had reduced the number of available battlecruisers sufficiently to warrant a reduction to two squadrons. Following the War, battlecruiser numbers were again increased to three, with a fourth building.

In late 1919, the Battlecruiser Squadron was formed, consisting of HMS Tiger, flagship of Rear Admiral Sir Roger B. Keyes, KCB, KCVO, CMG, along with HMS Renown and HMS Repulse. HMS Tiger was removed from operational service with the commissioning of HMS Hood in May 1920, and relegated to a training role. HMS Hood then became the flagship of the Battlecruiser Squadron on 18 May 1920.

== Special Service Squadron ==
In 1923, HMS Hood and HMS Repulse, along with several smaller ships of the First Light Cruiser Squadron, formed part of the Special Service Squadron, under command of Vice-Admiral Sir Frederick Field. The Squadron departed Devonport on 27 November 1923 and returned on 29 September 1924 after travelling around the world.

== Inter-War Period ==
Hood was decommissioned for a major overhaul from May 1929 to May 1931. During this period, flagship duties were transferred to Renown, and Tiger was returned to active service, to maintain the three ship strength of the squadron. Following her recommissioning, Hood again became flagship of the squadron, and remained the flagship until her loss on 24 May 1941. Tiger was decommissioned on 30 March 1931 and scrapped shortly after.

== Dissolution ==
HMS Hood was lost in action with the German battleship Bismarck at the Battle of Denmark Strait on 24 May 1941. HMS Repulse was sunk by Japanese aircraft off Kuantan, Malaya on 10 December 1941. With the loss of the Hood and later the Repulse, the squadron ceased to exist. HMS Renown survived the war and was scrapped in 1948.

== Rear-Admiral/Vice-Admiral commanding ==
Included:

Rear-Admiral/Vice-Admiral Commanding, Battlecruiser Squadron
	Rank	Flag	Name	Term	Flagship
1	Rear-Admiral	Rear-Admiral - Royal Navy	Sir Roger Keyes	8 April 1919 – 31 March 1921	Tiger
1	Rear-Admiral	Rear-Admiral - Royal Navy	Sir Roger Keyes	8 April 1919 – 31 March 1921	Hood
2	Rear-Admiral	Rear-Admiral - Royal Navy	Sir Walter Cowan	31 March 1921 – 15 May 1923	Hood
3	Vice-Admiral	Vice-Admiral - Royal Navy	Sir Frederick Field	5 May 1923 – 13 October 1924	Hood
4	Vice-Admiral	Vice-Admiral - Royal Navy	Cyril Fuller	30 April 1925 – 21 May 1927	Hood
5	Vice-Admiral	Vice-Admiral - Royal Navy	Sir Frederic Dreyer	21 May 1927 – 21 May 1929	Hood
6	Vice-Admiral	Vice-Admiral - Royal Navy	Dudley Pound	21 May 1929 – 24 April 1931	Renown
7	Vice-Admiral	Vice-Admiral - Royal Navy	Wilfred Tomkinson	24 April 1931 – 15 August 1934	Hood
8	Vice-Admiral	Vice-Admiral - Royal Navy	Sir William James	15 August 1932 – 14 August 1934	Hood
9	Vice-Admiral	Vice-Admiral - Royal Navy	Sir Sidney Bailey	14 August 1934 – 22 July 1936	Hood
10	Vice-Admiral	Vice-Admiral - Royal Navy	Sir Geoffrey Blake	22 July 1936 – 3 July 1937	Hood
11	Vice-Admiral	Vice-Admiral - Royal Navy	Sir Andrew Cunningham	3 July 1937 – 23 July 1938	Hood
12	Rear-Admiral	Rear-Admiral - Royal Navy	Geoffrey Layton	23 July 1938 – 1 June 1939	Hood
13	Rear-Admiral	Rear-Admiral - Royal Navy	William Whitworth	1 June 1939 – 11 March 1940	Hood
14	Rear-Admiral	Rear-Admiral - Royal Navy	Sir James Somerville	30 June - 10 August 1940	Hood
15	Rear-Admiral	Rear-Admiral - Royal Navy	William Whitworth	10 August 1940 – 8 May 1941	Hood
16	Vice-Admiral	Vice-Admiral - Royal Navy	Lancelot Holland	12–24 May 1941	Hood
