= Second Sea Lord =

British Royal Navy senior admiral

Office of the Second Sea Lord and Deputy Chief of the Naval Staff
- Ensign of the Royal Navy

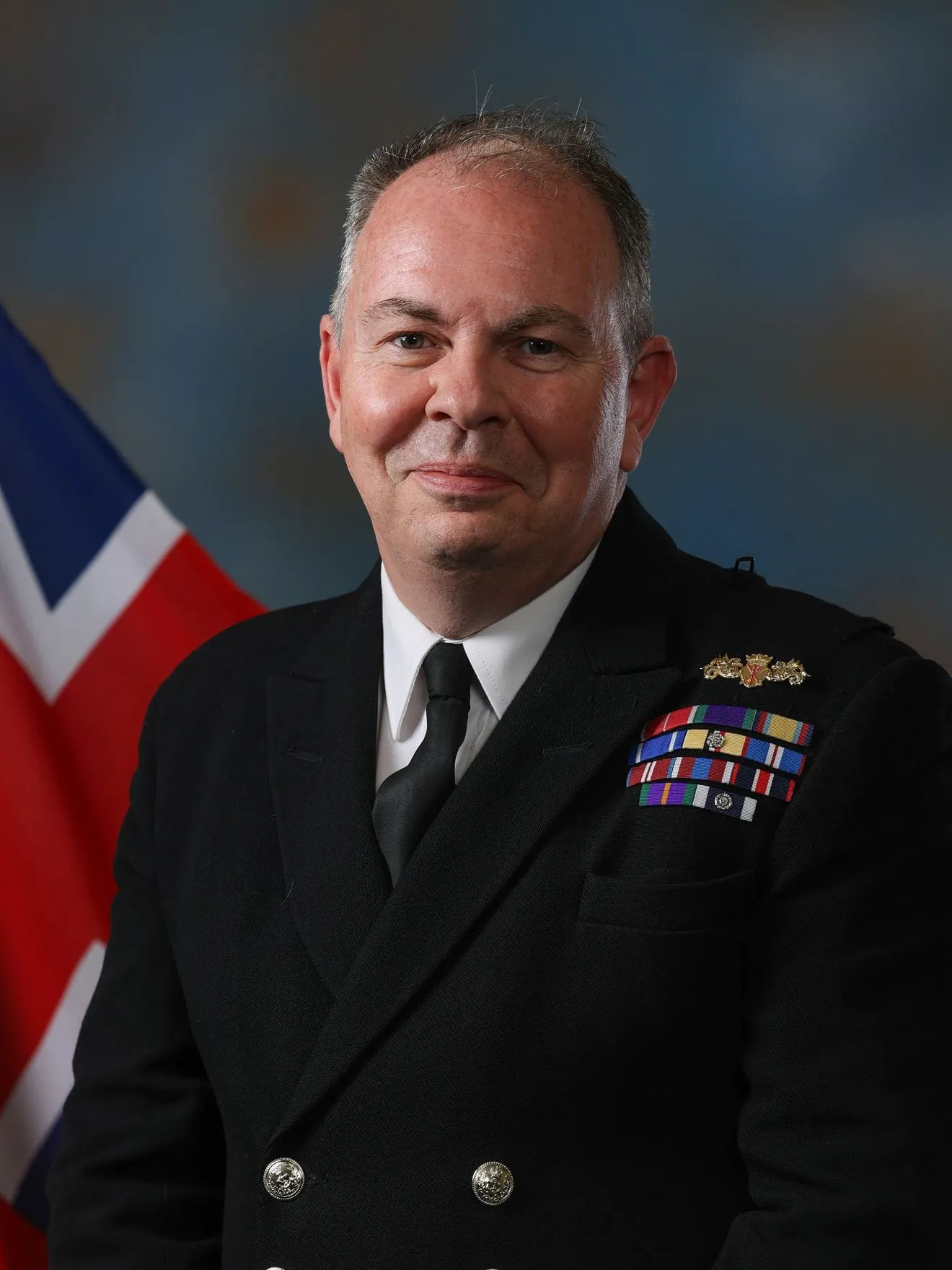
- Incumbent; Vice Admiral Paul Beattie since 30 September 2025
- Ministry of Defence; Royal Navy
- Abbreviation: 2SL/DCNS
- Member of: Admiralty Board; Navy Board
- Reports to: First Sea Lord
- Nominator: Secretary of State for Defence
- Appointer: Prime Minister; Subject to formal approval by the King-in-Council
- Term length: Not fixed (typically 4–5 years)
- Inaugural holder: Rear Admiral George Dundas
- Formation: Second Naval Lord, 1830–1904; Second Sea Lord from 1904

The Second Sea Lord and Deputy Chief of the Naval Staff (formerly Second Sea Lord) is deputy to the First Sea Lord and the second highest-ranking officer currently to serve in the Royal Navy and is responsible for personnel and naval shore establishments. Originally titled Second Naval Lord in 1830, the post was restyled Second Sea Lord in 1904. They are based at Navy Command Headquarters.

== History ==
In 1805, for the first time, specific functions were assigned to each of the 'Naval' Lords, who were described as 'Professional' Lords, leaving to the 'Civil' Lords the routine business of signing documents. The Second Naval Lord was the second most senior Naval Lord on the Board of Admiralty and as Chief of Naval Personnel was responsible for handling all personnel matters for the Royal Navy. In 1917 the title was changed to the Second Sea Lord and Chief of Naval Personnel by an order in council dated 23 October.

The posts of Second Sea Lord and Commander-in-Chief, Naval Home Command (CINCNAVHOME) were amalgamated in 1994 in the reductions of the British Armed Forces following the end of the Cold War. The original post of Commander-in-Chief, Naval Home Command had been created on 1 July 1969, as a result of the merger of the posts of Commander-in-Chief, Portsmouth and Commander-in-Chief, Plymouth.

2SL is based in Portsmouth in a combined headquarters with the Fleet Commander on Whale Island. Until October 2012, he flew his flag from HMS Victory, the world's oldest commissioned warship, which is preserved in dry dock in Portsmouth. The right to use HMS Victory as a flagship came from his position as CINCNAVHOME, who in turn acquired it from the Commander-in-Chief, Portsmouth. Since October 2012, distinct Commander-in-Chief posts have been discontinued and full command responsibility is vested in the First Sea Lord, who now flies his flag from Victory; this change formed part of the Levene reforms which were implemented at that time.

In 2016 the post was retitled Second Sea Lord & Deputy Chief of the Naval Staff and defined as "responsible for the delivery of the Naval Service’s current and future personnel, equipment and infrastructure".

== Second Naval Lords, 1830–1904 ==
Second Naval Lords include:

- Rear Admiral George Dundas, 1830–1834
- Vice-Admiral Sir William Parker, 1834
- Vice-Admiral Sir John Beresford, 1835–1841
- Vice-Admiral Sir William Parker, 1835–1841
- Rear Admiral Sir Edward Troubridge, 1841
- Vice-Admiral Sir William Gage, 1841–1846
- Vice-Admiral Sir James Dundas, 1846–1847
- Vice-Admiral Sir Henry Prescott, 1847
- Vice-Admiral Sir Maurice Berkeley, 1847–1852
- Vice-Admiral Sir Houston Stewart, 1852
- Vice-Admiral Sir Phipps Hornby, 1852–1853
- Vice-Admiral Sir Maurice Berkeley, 1853–1854
- Vice-Admiral Sir Richard Dundas, 1854–1855
- Vice-Admiral Henry Eden, 1855–1857
- Vice-Admiral Sir Richard Dundas, 1857
- Vice-Admiral Henry Eden, 1857–1858
- Vice-Admiral Sir Richard Dundas, 1858–1859
- Rear Admiral Frederick Pelham, 1859–1861
- Vice-Admiral Sir Charles Eden, 1861–1866
- Vice-Admiral Sir Sydney Dacres, 1866–1868
- Vacant, 1868–1872
- Vice-Admiral Sir John Tarleton, 1872–1874
- Vice-Admiral Sir Geoffrey Hornby, 1874–1877
- Vice-Admiral Sir Arthur Hood 1877–1879
- Admiral Richard Meade, 4th Earl of Clanwilliam, 1879–1880
- Admiral Lord John Hay, 1880–1883
- Admiral Beauchamp Seymour, 1st Baron Alcester, 1883–1885
- Admiral Sir Anthony Hoskins, 1885–1888
- Vice-Admiral Sir Vesey Hamilton, 1888–1889
- Admiral Sir Henry Fairfax, 1889–1892
- Admiral Sir Frederick Richards, 1892–1893
- Admiral Lord Walter Kerr, 1893–1895
- Vice-Admiral Sir Frederick Bedford, 1895–1899
- Admiral Lord Walter Kerr, 1899
- Vice-Admiral Archibald Douglas, 1899–1902
- Admiral Sir John Fisher, 1902–1903

== Second Sea Lords, 1904–1917 ==
Second Sea Lords include:

- Vice-Admiral Sir Charles Drury, 1903–1907
- Admiral Sir William May, 1907–1909
- Vice-Admiral Sir Francis Bridgeman, 1909–1911
- Vice-Admiral Sir George Egerton, 1911
- Vice-Admiral Prince Louis of Battenberg, 1911–1912
- Vice-Admiral Sir John Jellicoe, 1912–1914
- Vice-Admiral Sir Frederick Hamilton, 1914–1916
- Vice-Admiral Sir Somerset Gough-Calthorpe, 1916
- Admiral Sir Cecil Burney, 1916–1917

== Second Sea Lord and Chief of Naval Personnel 1917–1995 ==
- Admiral Sir Rosslyn Wemyss, 1917
- Vice-Admiral Sir Herbert Heath, 1917–1919
- Admiral Sir Montague Browning, 1919–1920
- Admiral Sir Henry Oliver, 1920–1924
- Vice-Admiral Sir Michael Culme-Seymour, 4th Baronet, 1924–1925
- Vice-Admiral Sir Hubert Brand, 1925–1927
- Admiral Sir Michael Hodges, 1927–1930
- Admiral Sir Cyril Fuller, 1930–1932
- Admiral Sir Dudley Pound, 1932–1935
- Admiral Sir Martin Dunbar-Nasmith, 1935–1938
- Admiral Sir Charles Little, 1938–1941
- Admiral Sir William Whitworth, 1941–1944
- Admiral Sir Algernon Willis, 1944–1946
- Admiral Sir Arthur Power, 1946–1948
- Admiral Sir Cecil Harcourt, 1948–1950
- Admiral Sir Alexander Madden, 1950–1953
- Admiral Sir Guy Russell, 1953–1955
- Admiral Sir Charles Lambe, 1955–1957
- Vice-Admiral Sir Deric Holland-Martin, 1957–1959
- Admiral Sir Sir St John Tyrwhitt, 2nd Baronet, 1959–1961
- Admiral Sir Royston Wright, 1961–1965
- Admiral Sir Desmond Dreyer, 1965–1967
- Admiral Sir Peter Hill-Norton, 1967
- Admiral Sir Frank Twiss, 1967–1970
- Vice-Admiral Sir Andrew Lewis, 1970–1971
- Admiral Sir Derek Empson, 1971–1974
- Admiral Sir David Williams, 1974–1977
- Admiral Sir Gordon Tait, 1977–1979
- Admiral Sir Desmond Cassidi, 1979–1982
- Admiral Sir Simon Cassels, 1982–1986
- Admiral Sir Richard Fitch, 1986–1988
- Admiral Sir Brian Brown, 1988–1991
- Admiral Sir Michael Livesay, 1991–1992
- Admiral Sir Michael Layard, 1992–1995

== Second Sea Lords and Commanders-in-Chief Naval Home Command, 1995–2012 ==
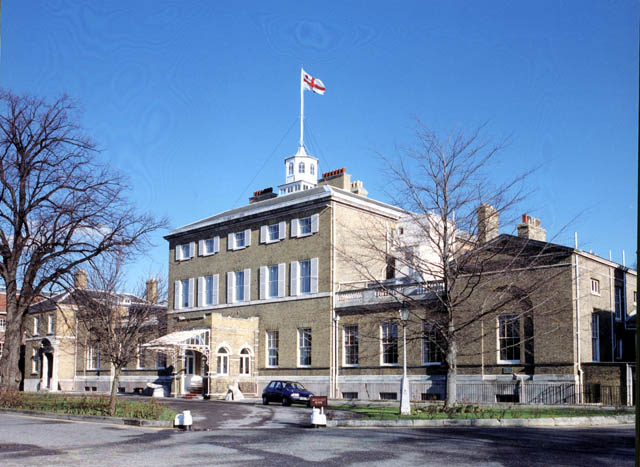
From 1995 to 2012 the Second Sea Lord was (as Commander-in-Chief) based in Admiralty House within HMNB Portsmouth (note the Vice-Admiral's flag in this 2006 photo).

Second Sea Lords and Commanders-in-Chief include:

| Rank | Name | Image | In office |
|---|---|---|---|
| Admiral | Sir Michael Boyce | | 1995–1997 |
| Admiral | Sir John Brigstocke | | 1997–2000 |
| Vice-Admiral | Sir Peter Spencer | | 2000–2003 |
| Admiral | Sir James Burnell-Nugent | | 2003–2005 |
| Vice-Admiral | Sir Adrian Johns | | 2005–2008 |
| Vice-Admiral | Sir Alan Massey | | 2008–2010 |
| Vice-Admiral | Sir Charles Montgomery | | 2010–2012 |

== Second Sea Lords and Chiefs of Naval Personnel and Training, 2012–2015 ==
| Rank | Name | Image | In office |
|---|---|---|---|
| Vice Admiral | Sir Charles Montgomery | | 2012 (and see above) |
| Vice Admiral | Sir David Steel | | 2012–2015 |

== Second Sea Lord and Deputy Chief of the Naval Staff, 2015–present ==
See: Deputy Chief of the Naval Staff

| Rank | Name | Image | In office |
|---|---|---|---|
| Vice Admiral | Sir Jonathan Woodcock | | 2SL: 2015–2018, Deputy CNS: 2016–2018 |
| Vice Admiral | Tony Radakin | | 2018–2019 |
| Vice Admiral | Nick Hine | | 2019–2022 |
| Vice Admiral | Sir Martin Connell | | 2022–2025 |
| Vice Admiral | Paul Beattie | | 2025–present |

== Departments under the office ==
As of September 2020:

=== 2017–2020 ===
- Director People and Training, previously the Naval Secretary
- Director Development, previously the Assistant Chief of the Naval Staff (Capability)
- Office of the Assistant Chief (Policy)
- Office of the Director of Personnel and Training & Office of the Naval Secretary
- Director Navy Acquisition

=== Former ===
Included:

- Admiralty Interview Board
- Naval Careers Service
- Naval Education Service
- Office of the Medical Director-General (Naval)
- Royal Navy Medical Service
- Royal Naval Hospital
- Office the Director Naval Nursing Service
- Queen Alexandra's Royal Naval Nursing Service
- Royal Naval Reserve
- Royal Marines Reserve
- Department of the Director Combined Operations Personnel
- Department of the Director Naval Education
  - Britannia Royal Naval College
  - Royal Naval College, Dartmouth
  - Royal Naval College, Greenwich
  - Royal Naval College (Portsmouth)
  - Royal Naval War College
- Department of the Engineer Rear Admiral Assistant
- Department of the Paymaster Director General
- Department of the Director General Medical Services
- Department of the Director General Supply & Secretariat Branch
- Department of the Director of Air Personnel
- Department of the Paymaster Director-General
- Department of the Director Physical Training & Sport
- Department of the Director of Personnel Services
- Department of the Director Welfare Conditions
- Department of the Director of Manning
- Department of the Director Recruiting
- Department of the Director Service Conditions
- Department of the Director of Training
- Directorate General Training, (1960–1969)
- Directorate-General Naval Manpower and Training (1972–1994)
- Department of the Engineer-in-chief, as regards personnel
- Medical Director-General of the Navy
  - Dental Examining Board
  - Medical Consultative Board
  - Medical Examining Board
- Naval Intelligence Department, as regards mobilisation of the fleet
- Naval Mobilisation Department, as regards personnel
- Office of the Admiral Commanding, Coastguard and Reserves
- Office of the Admiral Commanding Reserves, as regards personnel
- Office of the Admiral Superintendent, Naval Reserves, as regards personnel
- Office of the Adviser on Education
- Office of the Chief of Staff, Reserves
- Office of the Controller of the Coastguard
- Office of the Deputy Adjutant General Royal Marines
- Office of the Adjutant General Royal Marines
- Office of the Chaplain of the Fleet, as regards naval schools
- Office of the Engineer Rear Admiral for Personnel Duties
- Royal Naval Academy
- Royal Naval Volunteer Reserve
- Statistics Department

== See also ==
- First Sea Lord
- Third Sea Lord
- Fourth Sea Lord
- Fifth Sea Lord
