= Atlantic Fleet (United Kingdom) =

Former naval fleet of the Royal Navy

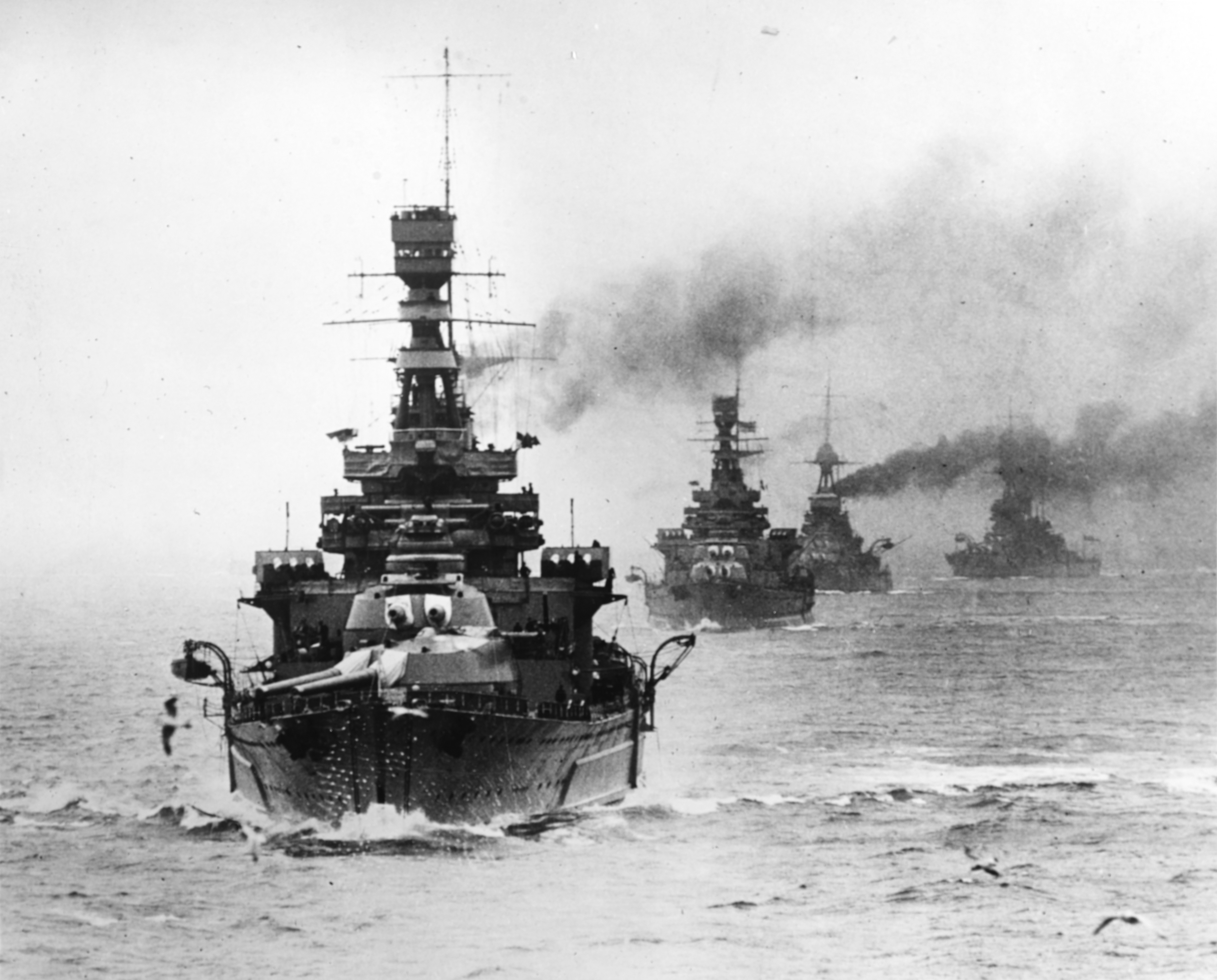
- Capital Ships of the Atlantic Fleet
- Active: 1909–1914;1919–1932
- Country: United Kingdom
- Branch: Royal Navy
- Type: Fleet

The Atlantic Fleet was a naval fleet of the Royal Navy. It existed for two periods; 1909 until 1914, and then 1919 until 1932.

== History ==
On 14 December 1904 the Channel Fleet was re-styled the 'Atlantic Fleet'. The Atlantic Fleet lasted until 1912 when rising tensions with Germany forced the Royal Navy to relook at fleet formations and the Atlantic Fleet became the 3rd Battle Squadron. The Atlantic Fleet was based at Gibraltar to reinforce either the Channel Fleet or the Mediterranean Fleet, from January 1905 to February 1907. It remained at Gibraltar until April 1912.

The Atlantic Fleet was again formed after the end of World War I, when British naval forces were reorganised to reflect the changed economic and political situation in Europe. The fleet was created upon the disbandment of the Grand Fleet in April 1919, absorbing many, but not all of its elements. It was placed under a Commander-in-Chief, who for part of that year held the title of Commander-in-Chief Atlantic and Home Fleets, before the Home Fleet became the Reserve Fleet and a totally separate command. HMS Queen Elizabeth became the Fleet's flagship and served in that capacity until 1924.

The fleet never fought in a naval battle in its short history. In 1931, during the Invergordon Mutiny, sailors of the fleet openly refused to obey orders because of a dispute over pay with the government. The fleet's short history ended in 1932, when the Admiralty having been shaken by the events of the Invergordon Mutiny, renamed the fleet, as the Home Fleet.

== Senior officers ==
=== Commanders-in-Chief Atlantic Fleet ===
The Commander-in-Chief's title was "Commander-in-Chief, Atlantic Fleet" between 1904 and 1910, and "Vice-Admiral Commanding, Atlantic Fleet" from 1910 to 1912.

Commander-in-Chief Atlantic Fleet (first formation)
	Rank	Flag	Name	Term	Title
1	Vice-Admiral	Vice-Admiral - Royal Navy	Lord Charles Beresford	31 December 1904 – 1 March 1905	Commander-in-Chief
2	Vice-Admiral	Vice-Admiral - Royal Navy	Sir William May	1 March 1905 – 23 February 1907	Commander-in-Chief
3	Vice-Admiral	Vice-Admiral - Royal Navy	Sir Assheton Curzon-Howe	23 February 1907 – 19 November 1908	Commander-in-Chief
4	Vice-Admiral	Vice-Admiral - Royal Navy	Prince Louis of Battenberg	19 November 1908 – 20 December 1910	Commander-in-Chief
5	Vice-Admiral	Vice-Admiral - Royal Navy	Sir John Jellicoe	20 December 1910 – 19 December 1911	Vice-Admiral Commanding
6	Acting Vice-Admiral	Vice-Admiral - Royal Navy	Sir Cecil Burney	19 December 1911 – July, 1912	Vice-Admiral Commanding

Commander-in-Chief Atlantic Fleet (second formation)
	Rank	Flag	Name	Term
1	Admiral	Admiral - Royal Navy	Sir Charles Madden, 1st Baronet	8 April 1919 – 15 August 1922
2	Admiral	Admiral - Royal Navy	Sir John de Robeck	15 August 1922 – 15 August 1924
3	Admiral	Admiral - Royal Navy	Sir Henry Oliver	15 August 1924 – 15 August 1927
4	Admiral	Admiral - Royal Navy	Sir Hubert Brand	15 August 1927 – 17 April 1929
5	Admiral	Admiral - Royal Navy	Sir Ernle Chatfield	17 April 1929 – 27 May 1930
6	Vice-Admiral	Vice-Admiral - Royal Navy	Sir Michael Hodges	27 May 1930 – 6 October 1931
7	Admiral	Admiral - Royal Navy	Sir John Kelly	6 October 1931 – 1932

==== Rear-Admiral, Second-in-Command, Atlantic Fleet ====
The post of Rear-Admiral Second-in-Command, Atlantic existed during the first formation of the Atlantic Fleet from June 1904 to August 1912. There were no admirals appointed as seconds-in-command in the fleet's second iteration.

Rear-Admiral, Second-in-Command, Atlantic Fleet
	Rank	Flag	Name	Term
1	Rear-Admiral	Rear-Admiral - Royal Navy	Francis Bridgeman	25 June 1904 – 25 August 1905
2	Rear-Admiral	Rear-Admiral - Royal Navy	Sir Berkeley Milne	25 August 1905 – 25 August 1906
3	Rear-Admiral	Rear-Admiral - Royal Navy	George Egerton	25 August 1906 – 28 August 1907
4	Rear-Admiral	Rear-Admiral - Royal Navy	Sir John Jellicoe	28 August 1907 – 25 August 1908
5	Rear-Admiral	Rear-Admiral - Royal Navy	William Fisher	25 August 1908 – 26 August 1909
6	Rear-Admiral	Rear-Admiral - Royal Navy	Sir Colin Keppel	26 August 1909 – 12 September 1910
7	Rear-Admiral	Rear-Admiral - Royal Navy	Sackville Carden	12 September 1910 – 29 August 1911 (co-assigned)
8	Rear-Admiral	Rear-Admiral - Royal Navy	Sir Christopher Cradock	29 August 1911 – 29 August 1912

==== Commodore/Rear-Admiral (D) Commanding Destroyer Flotillas, Atlantic Fleet ====
Post holders included:

Commodore(D) Atlantic Fleet/Rear-Admiral (D) Commanding Destroyer Flotillas, Atlantic Fleet
	Rank	Flag	Name	Term
1	Commodore 2nd Class		Hugh Tweedie	1919 - May 1920
2	Rear-Admiral	Rear-Admiral - Royal Navy	Michael Hodges	May 1920-July 1922
3	Rear-Admiral	Rear-Admiral - Royal Navy	Arthur Waistell	July 1922-April 1923
4	Rear-Admiral	Rear-Admiral - Royal Navy	Sir George Baird	April 1923-September 1924
5	Rear-Admiral	Rear-Admiral - Royal Navy	Colin Maclean	September 1924–September 1926
6	Rear-Admiral	Rear-Admiral - Royal Navy	Wion Egerton	September 1926-July 1928
7	Commodore 2nd Class		Robin Dalglish	July 1928-August 1930
8	Commodore 2nd Class		Edward Osborne	August 1930-March 1932 continued as R.Adm (D) HF till July 1932.

==== Chief of Staff, Atlantic Fleet ====
Second Formation included

	Rank	Flag	Name	Term
Chief of Staff, Atlantic Fleet
1	Rear-Admiral	Rear-Admiral - Royal Navy	Michael H.Hodges	April 1919 - May 1920
2	Commodore 1st Class		Cyril Fuller	1 May 1920 – 14 August 1922
2	Rear-Admiral	Rear-Admiral - Royal Navy	William Fisher	14 August 1922 – 14 August 1924
3	Rear-Admiral	Rear-Admiral - Royal Navy	Arthur Davies	14 August 1924 – October 1927 (initially-Cdre, 1.Cls)
4	Rear-Admiral	Rear-Admiral - Royal Navy	Matthew R.Best	October 1927 – December 1927
5	Commodore 2nd Class		Geoffrey Blake	December 1927 – April 1929

== Components ==
=== First formation ===
Distribution of the Fleet first formation included:

	Unit	Date	Notes
1	2nd Cruiser Squadron	January 1905 – March 1909	replaced by 5th CSQ
2	5th Cruiser Squadron	March 1909 – April 1912	
3	Atlantic Fleet Flotilla	1906–1907	no destroyers after 1907
4	8 battleships	January 1905 – March 1909	distributed
4	7 pre-dreadnoughts	March 1909 – April 1912	distributed

=== Second formation ===
Distribution of the Fleet second formation included:

	Unit	Date	Notes
1	1st Battle Squadron	1919 – November 1924	re-titled 2nd BS
2	2nd Battle Squadron	1919 – May 1924	absorbed into 1st BS
3	3rd Battle Squadron	March 1926 – May 1930	ex Mediterranean Fleet
4	Battlecruiser Squadron	1919 – September 1936	to Med, 4.39-returned to Home Fleet
5	Aircraft Carriers	1919 – September 1931	
6	Aircraft Carrier Squadron	September 1931 – 1932	
7	1st Light Cruiser Squadron	1919 – November 1924	to Mediterranean Fleet
8	2nd Light Cruiser Squadron	1919–1920	re-designated 2nd CSQ
9	2nd Cruiser Squadron	1920–1932	
10	1st Destroyer Flotilla	1919 – April 1925	
10	2nd Destroyer Flotilla	1919 – November 1924	to Mediterranean Fleet
11	3rd Destroyer Flotilla	1919 – August 1923	to Mediterranean Fleet
12	4th Destroyer Flotilla	1919 – August 1923	to Mediterranean Fleet
13	5th Destroyer Flotilla	1919 – April 1925	to Mediterranean Fleet as 1DF
14	6th Destroyer Flotilla	1919–1921	absorbed 8th DF
15	7th Destroyer Flotilla	1925 – August 1928	
16	8th Destroyer Flotilla	1925 – August 1927	to China Station
17	9th Destroyer Flotilla	1925 – August 1927	absorbed 7th DF
18	1st Submarine Flotilla	1919–1927	Rosyth Command to 1926 then to Nore Command till 1927
19	2nd Submarine Flotilla	1919–1924	Plymouth Command to 1924, after to FO, Malta
20	3rd Submarine Flotilla	1919–1927	Portsmouth Command to 1922 Plymouth Command till 1927 then to 2nd SF
21	5th Submarine Flotilla	1919–1932	Portsmouth Command
22	6th Submarine Flotilla	1919–1932	FO, Portland
