= HMS Prince of Wales (1860) =

Ship of the line of the Royal Navy

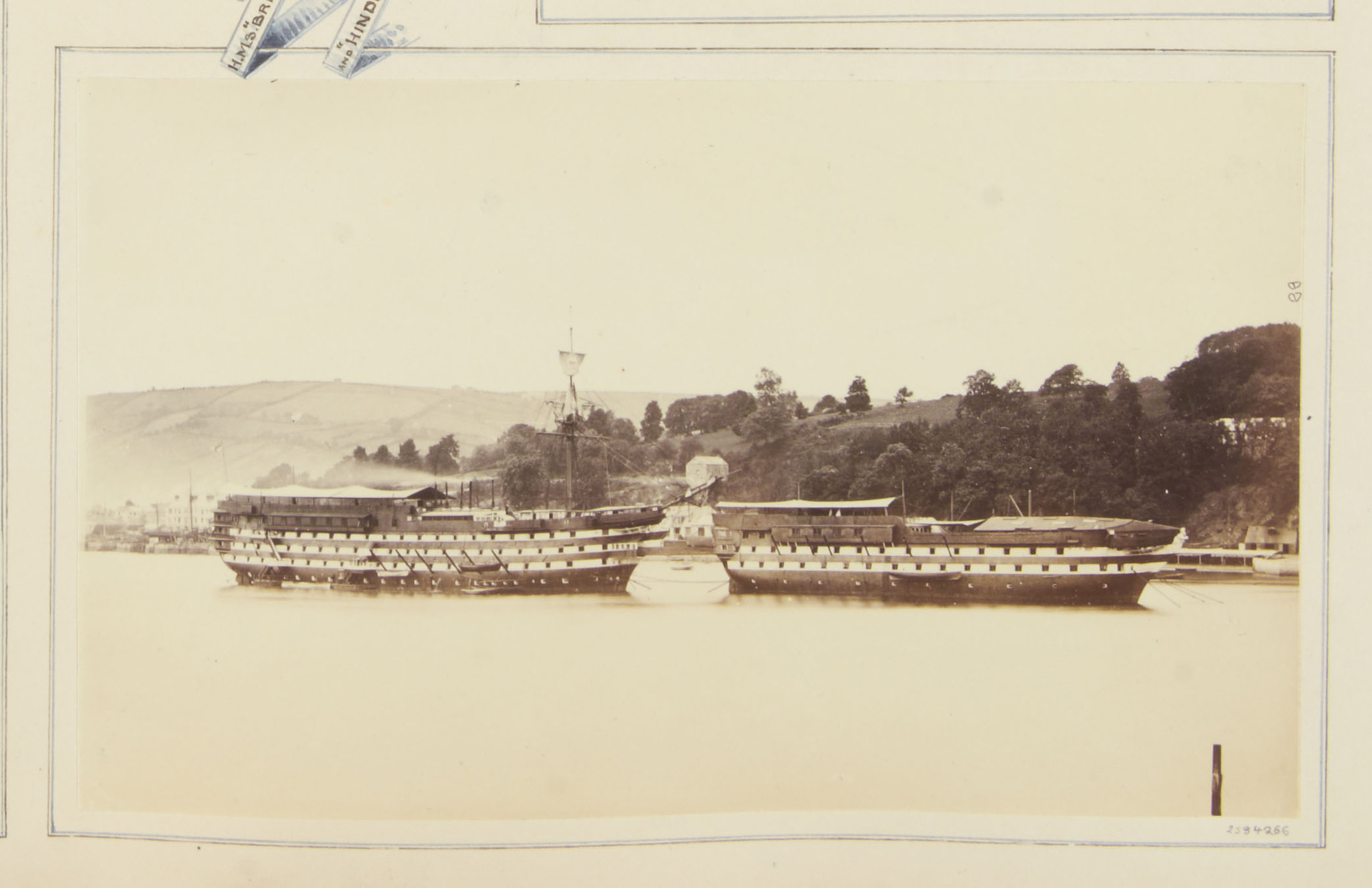
- Britannia (left) and Hindostan, photographed in 1878

History

United Kingdom
- Name: Prince of Wales
- Namesake: Prince of Wales
- Ordered: 29 June 1848
- Builder: Portsmouth Dockyard
- Laid down: 10 June 1848
- Launched: 25 January 1860
- Renamed: Britannia, 3 March 1869
- Stricken: , September 1909
- Fate: Sold for scrap, 13 September 1914, resold 1916

General characteristics (as built)
- Class & type: 121-gun modified Queen-class ship of the line
- Tonnage: 3,994 18/94 (bm)
- Displacement: 6,201 long tons (6,301 t)
- Length: 252 ft (76.8 m) (gun deck)
- Beam: 60 ft 2.5 in (18.4 m)
- Depth of hold: 25 ft 2 in (7.7 m)
- Installed power: Boilers; 3,352 ihp (2,500 kW)
- Propulsion: 1 screw; trunk steam engine
- Speed: 12.6 knots (23.3 km/h; 14.5 mph)
- Complement: 1,100
- Armament: 121 muzzle-loading, smoothbore guns; Lower gun deck: 32 × 8 in (203 mm) shell guns; Middle gun deck: 30 × 8 in shell guns; Upper gun deck: 32 × 32-pdr guns; Quarterdeck and forecastle: 26 × 32-pdr guns + 1 × 68-pdr gun

HMS Prince of Wales was a 121-gun, first-rate, modified Queen-class ship of the line built for the Royal Navy (RN) during the 1850s. She was converted to screw-propulsion whilst still under construction. Completed in 1860, the ship was immediately placed in ordinary and never served on active duty. In 1869 she was renamed HMS Britannia and under that name served at Dartmouth as a cadet training ship until 1905. The ship was hulked in 1909 and was sold for scrap in 1914; she was resold two years later and subsequently broken up.

== Background and description ==
Prince of Wales was originally ordered on 14 March 1842 as a sister ship of the Surveyor of the Navy, Sir William Symonds's, 110-gun, first rate Queen, but work was suspended on 9 December. After Symonds's resignation in 1847, her design was modified by the Assistant Surveyor John Edye into a 120-gun ship and she was reordered to the modified design on 29 June 1848. She was intended to measure 210 feet (64 m) at the gun deck and 171 feet 1 inch (52.1 m) at the keel. The ship would have had a beam of 60 feet (18.3 m), a depth of hold of 24 feet 8 inches (7.5 m) and had a tonnage of 3,185 61/94 tons burthen. Her crew would have numbered 970 officers and ratings. The ship had the usual three-masted full-ship rig.

The ship was intended to be armed with 120 muzzle-loading, smoothbore guns that consisted of thirty 8 in (203 mm) (65 cwt), 68-pounder shell guns (Note: "Cwt" is the abbreviation for hundredweight, 65 cwt referring to the weight of the gun.) on her lower gun deck, thirty 32-pounder (56 cwt) guns on her middle gun deck and thirty 32-pounders (42 cwt) on her upper gun deck. Her forecastle and quarterdeck would have carried a total of six 32-pounders (42 cwt) and fourteen short 32-pounder (25 cwt) guns between them. Four 18-pounder carronades would have been positioned on her poop deck.

=== Conversion ===
The naval arms race between France and Britain in steam-propelled ships of the line resumed after the Crimean War ended in 1856. Based on the experience gained during the war, Captain Sir Baldwin Wake Walker, Surveyor of the Navy, favored converting first- and second-rate ships as they could accommodate the engines and their required coal better than smaller ships. He ordered Prince of Wales to be converted into a 121-gun ship along the same lines as Marlborough on 9 April 1856, although she was further lengthened than that ship.

The ship's length at the gun deck increased to 252 feet (76.8 m) and 213 feet (64.9 m) on the keel. She had a beam of 60 feet 2 inches (18.3 m) and her depth of hold measured 25 feet 2 inches (7.7 m). Prince of Wales had a tonnage of 3,994 18/94, and displaced 6,201 long tons (6,301 t). Her crew numbered 1,100 officers and ratings. The ship was fitted with a two-cylinder, horizontal, trunk steam engine that was built by John Penn and Sons. It was rated at 800 nominal horsepower and drove a single propeller shaft. To reduce drag and improve performance under sail, the ship could hoist her propeller into the hull and retract the telescoping funnel. During her sea trials on 31 October 1860 in Stokes Bay, the ship's boilers provided enough steam for the engine to produce 3,352 indicated horsepower (2,500 kW) that was good for a speed of 12.6 knots (23.3 km/h; 14.5 mph), although her masts were not rigged.

The ship was armed with 121 guns that consisted of thirty-two 8-inch (65 cwt), 68-pounder shell guns on her lower gun deck, thirty 8-inch shell guns on her middle gun deck and thirty-two 32-pounders (56 cwt) on her upper gun deck. Between her forecastle and quarterdeck, she carried twenty-six, 42 cwt, 32-pounder guns and a single 68-pounder gun that was positioned on the forecastle as a pivot gun so that it could serve as a bow chaser.

== Construction and career ==
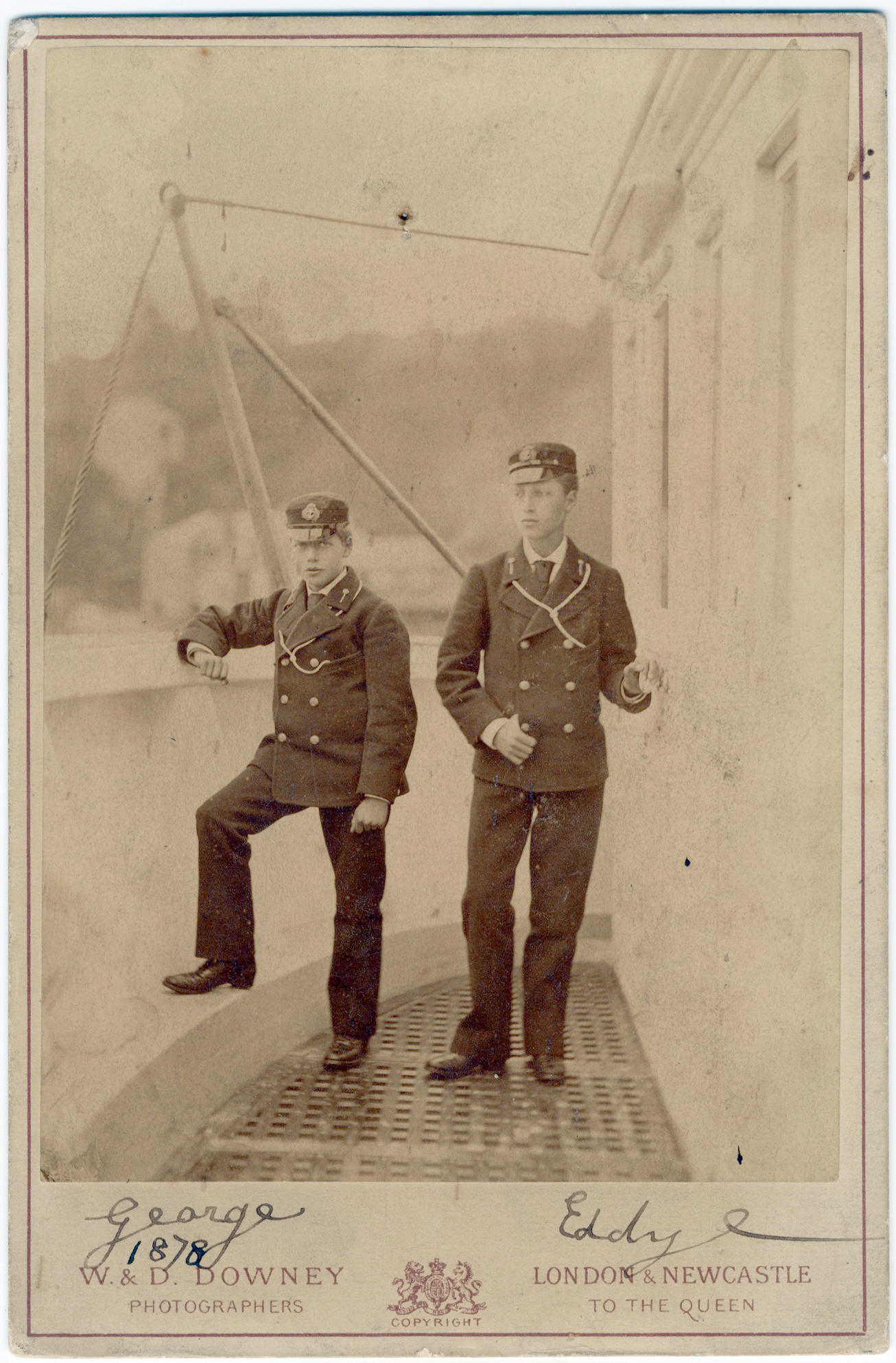
A photograph of the future King George V and his elder brother, Prince Albert Victor, dated by George 1878, as cadets on board the Britannia

Named in honour of the title of Prince of Wales of the heir to the throne,, Prince of Wales was the fifth ship of her name to serve in the RN. She was ordered on 29 June 1848, although she had already been laid down at HM Dockyard, Portsmouth, on 10 June. The ship was launched on 25 January 1860 and was immediately placed in ordinary. Prince of Wales was never fitted for sea. Her engines were removed in 1867 so they could be installed in the central-battery ironclad Repulse.

In 1869 the ship was renamed Britannia and began service as a training ship for naval cadets at Dartmouth, replacing the previous Britannia in that role. As Britannia, she was a hulk, and had only her foremast. Among those starting their naval careers on her were, in 1877, the future Admiral and First Sea Lord Rosslyn Wemyss, Prince Albert Victor, and his younger brother, the future King George V.

A shore-based college at Dartmouth was opened in September 1905 and this was named the Royal Naval College, Dartmouth. The Britannia training establishment was closed at the same time. The former Prince of Wales was officially hulked in September 1909, sold for scrap to Garnham on 23 September 1914, then resold to Hughes Bolckow two years later. It arrived at Blyth in July 1916 for demolition.

The figurehead of the ship, depicting the Prince of Wales, survives and can be seen at the Scottish Maritime Museum in Irvine.
