= Christian Fraser-Tytler =

Scottish army officer

Christian Fraser-Tytler CBE
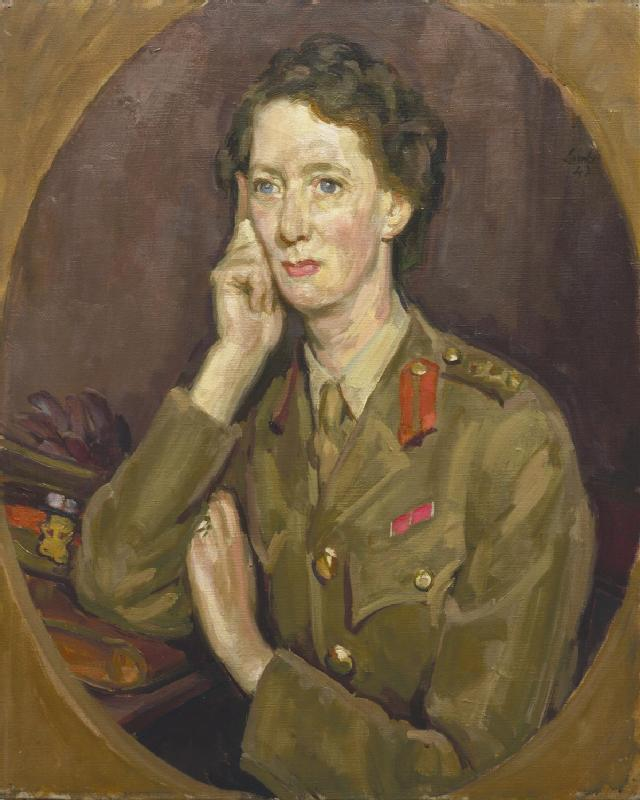
- Senior Controller Christian Helen Fraser-Tytler, CBE, Deputy Director of AA Command, ATS, by Henry Lamb, 1943

Christian Helen Fraser-Tytler CBE (née Shairp; 23 August 1897 – 1 July 1995) was a member of the Scottish landed gentry and a senior officer in Britain's Auxiliary Territorial Service (ATS) during World War II.

== Early life ==
Christian Fraser-Tytler was born at Elie in Fife, the daughter of John Campbell Shairp, a lawyer and the 9th Laird of Houstoun, Uphall, in Linlithgowshire, and his wife Harriet Caroline, daughter of the Sir Thomas Erskine, 2nd Baronet of Cambo. She was educated at home by a governess. In 1917, during World War I, she joined the Foreign Office as a clerical officer.

== Marriage ==
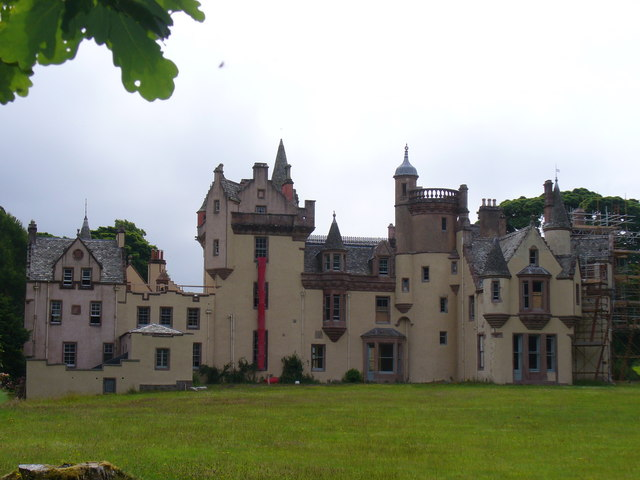
Aldourie Castle

In 1919 she was working with the British delegation to the negotiations for the Treaty of Versailles. There she met Major Neil Fraser-Tytler of Aldourie and Balnain, Inverness-shire, who had won a DSO and Bar with the Royal Field Artillery (RFA) during the recent war. They were married on 19 June 1919, and she became the Châtelain of Aldourie Castle on the shores of Loch Ness.

Neil Fraser-Tytler continued in the Territorial Army in the 1920s, commanding his old Inverness battery in the 75th (Highland) Brigade, RFA, and being promoted to Brevet Lieutenant-Colonel in 1924. He also published his wartime letters to his father under the title of Field Guns in France. However, his health became increasingly poor, believed to be the result of having been gassed during the war. He died in 1937 after a long illness through which his wife nursed him.

== Auxiliary Territorial Service ==
In 1938, as international tensions rose towards the Munich Crisis, the British government established the Auxiliary Territorial Service (ATS) as the women's branch of the British Army. Christian Fraser-Tytler raised the Inverness unit of the ATS. This was based at the Queen's Own Cameron Highlanders' depot and its members wore skirts of the regiment's Cameron of Erracht tartan rather than khaki.

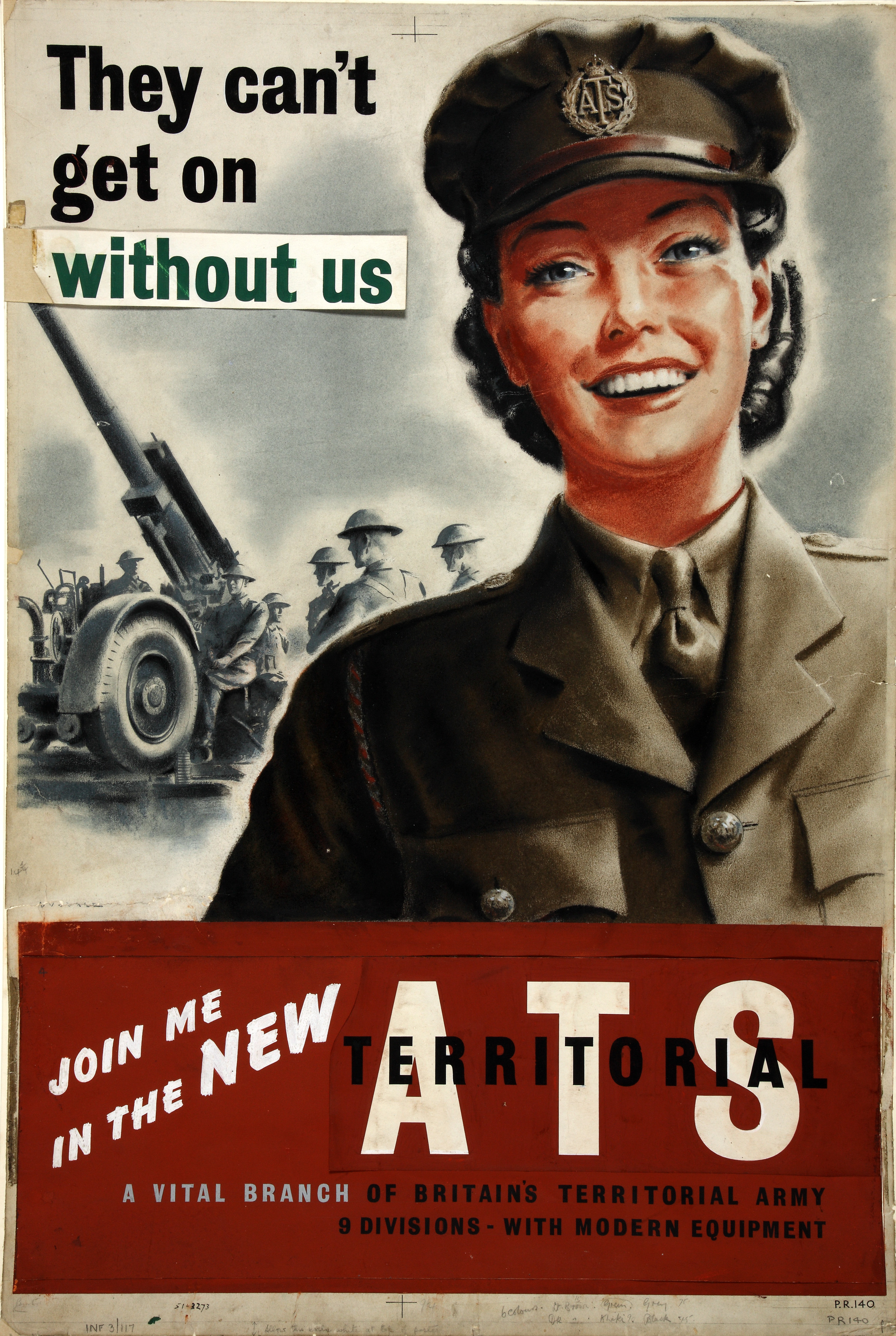
ATS recruitment poster

After the outbreak of World War II, Fraser-Tytler's organisational abilities were recognised and she was posted to the Adjutant-General's Department at the War Office and soon ran AG16, responsible for recruiting and organising the ATS alongside the ATS Directorate (AG15), under the Chief Controller, first Jean Knox and later Dame Leslie Whateley. Fraser-Tytler had become well known to the Royal Family when they inspected ATS units, and it is reported that when King George VI visited the War Office he expressed surprise that she was no longer wearing the Cameron of Erracht tartan kilt. When told that she had been ordered to revert to khaki when she joined the WO, he replied 'Well, we'll have to see about that', and shortly afterwards she was permitted to wear the kilt once more.

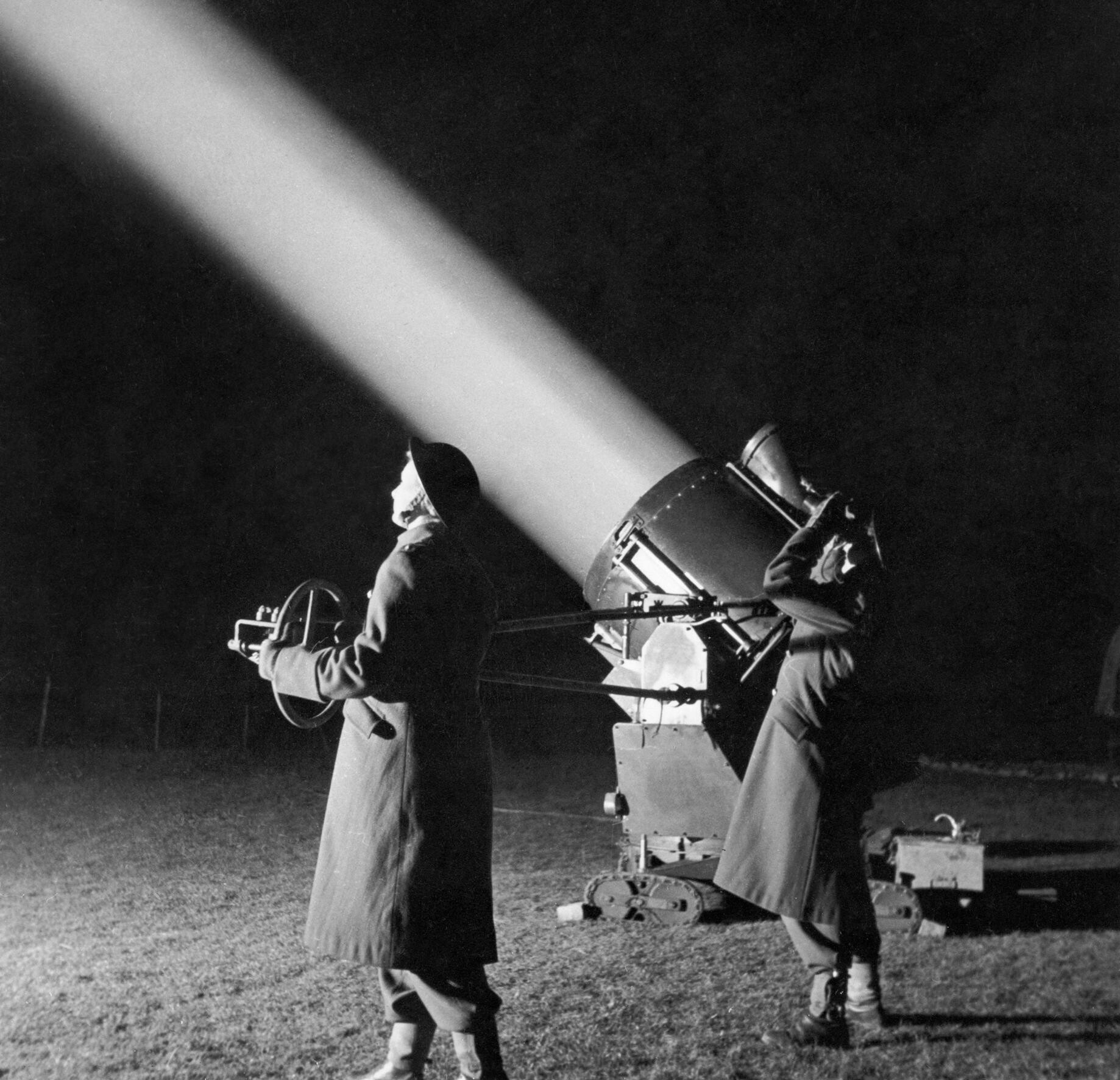
Two members of an ATS searchlight unit.

In June 1943 Fraser-Tytler was appointed Deputy Director, ATS, at Anti-Aircraft Command, with the rank of Senior Controller (equivalent to Brigadier). The usual roles for the ATS included drivers, cooks, telephonists, etc, but the imaginative commander-in-chief of AA Command, Lieutenant-General Sir Frederick 'Tim' Pile, had sought to solve his command's manpower issues by introducing women into every role in anti-aircraft units short of actually firing the guns, which was forbidden under Defence Regulations. From 1941 onwards all Heavy Anti-Aircraft gun batteries and regiments coming from the training regiments were designated 'Mixed', with women comprising about two-thirds of their personnel. Despite practical difficulties, there were some mixed searchlight batteries and one regiment (93rd Searchlight Regiment) that was almost wholly female. By the time Fraser-Tytler joined AA Command at its headquarters at Hillingdon House, Uxbridge, more than half the total strength of the ATS was employed in or supporting its units.

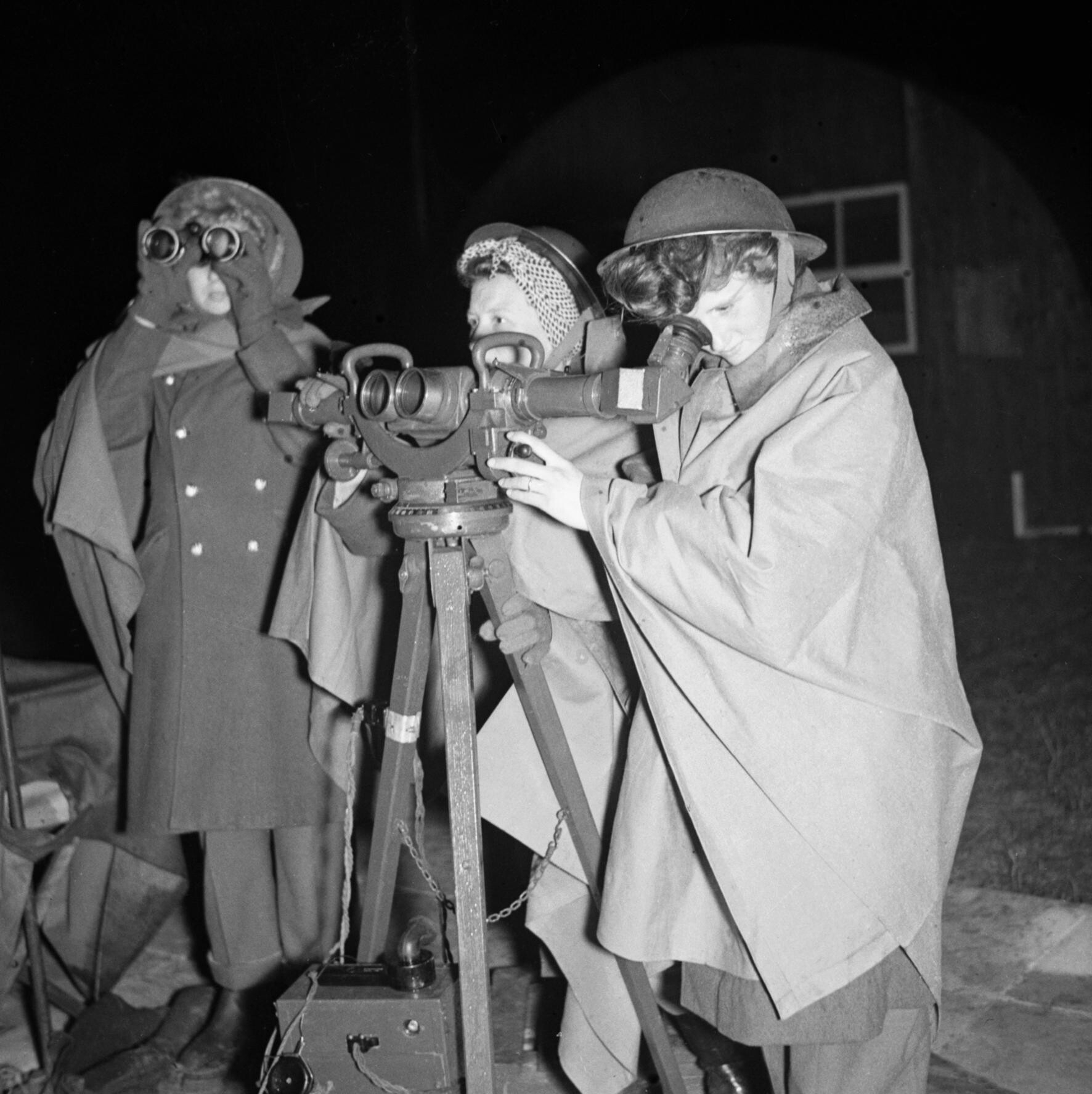
ATS personnel operating a rangefinder at a 3.7-inch AA gun site firing against V-1 flying bombs, 21 July 1944.

During 1944 a large proportion of AA Command's units were moved to Southern England to protect the build-up of troops, shipping and equipment for the forthcoming invasion of Normandy (Operation Overlord), and then to counter the attacks by V-1 flying bombs (codenamed 'Divers'). Operation Diver involved the relocation of hundreds of static AA guns to temporary sites along the South Coast of England, with the ATS housed in hastily constructed tented camps until huts could be provided. During the winter of 1944–45 the V-1 attacks were switched to Brussels and Antwerp, and several Mixed HAA regiments were withdrawn from AA Command to defend those cities.

Christian Fraser-Tytler was appointed a CBE (Military) – one of the first awarded to a woman – in 1941, and received the Territorial Decoration.

== Voluntary service ==
On leaving the ATS at the end of World War II, Christian Fraser-Tytler returned to Aldourie Castle and took up voluntary work. Locally, she organised the building of the village hall and founded the local branch of the Women's Rural Institute. She became a Justice of the peace, led the Women's Voluntary Service in Inverness-shire and Ross and Cromarty, and played a prominent part in the Young Women's Christian Association, serving as Scottish representative on the national executive.

== Family ==
She had two daughters by Lt-Col Neil Fraser-Tytler:

- Ann Fraser-Tytler, born 17 April 1920, married, 4 October 1947, her kinsman Sir Thomas David Erskine of Cambo, 5th Baronet.
- Mary Hermione Fraser-Tytler (born 6 June 1922 – died 29 December 2021), married Rear-Admiral Sir Patrick Morgan, KCVO, CB, DSC.

== Death ==
Christian Fraser-Tytler died on 1 July 1995.

== External sources ==
- British Military History
