= Jean Rivett-Drake =

British Army officer (1909–1999)

Dame Jean Elizabeth Rivett-Drake DBE, DL
- Born: 1909
- Died: August 8, 1999 (aged 89–90)
- Military career
- Allegiance: United Kingdom
- Branch: British Army
- Service years: 1942–1964
- Rank: Brigadier
- Units: Auxiliary Territorial Service; Women's Royal Army Corps
- Commands: Director, Women's Royal Army Corps (1961–1964)
- Awards: DBE; DL; MBE; Mentioned in despatches
- Other work: Mayor of Hove (1977–1978); Hove Borough Council (1966–1984); East Sussex County Council (1973–1977)

Brigadier Dame Jean Elizabeth Rivett-Drake, DBE, DL (1909 – 8 August 1999) was a senior British Army officer and politician. She served as director of the Women's Royal Army Corps between 1961 and 1964. After retiring from the army, she entered local politics and was elected to Hove Borough Council (1966–1984) and later to East Sussex County Council (1973–1977). She was Mayor of Hove from 1977 to 1978; she was the first woman to hold that appointment.

== Early life ==
Rivett-Drake was born in 1909 to Bertram Gregory Drake and Dora Rivett-Drake. Her father was a Royal Naval Reserve officer who served in the First World War and reached the rank of commander.

== Military career ==
Rivett-Drake joined the British Army to serve in the Second World War. She was commissioned in the Auxiliary Territorial Service (ATS) as a second subaltern (i.e. second lieutenant) on 15 April 1942. She continued in the ATS after the Second World War had ended. In 1946, Junior Commander (temporary) Rivett-Drake was mentioned in despatches "in recognition of gallant and distinguished services in North-West Europe". In the 1947 Birthday Honours, Senior Commander (temporary) Rivett-Drake was appointed a Member of the Order of the British Empire (MBE).

In 1949, she transferred to the newly created Women's Royal Army Corps (WRAC) with the rank of subaltern (i.e. lieutenant) and seniority from 13 July 1934. On 1 February 1949, he was promoted to junior commander (i.e. captain) with seniority in that rank from 13 July 1938, and then to senior commander (i.e. major) with seniority from 13 July 1945. She was promoted to lieutenant colonel on 2 April 1956, and to colonel on 27 May 1957.

Rivett-Drake was director of the Women s Royal Army Corps from 1961 to 1964. During this appointment, she was also an honorary aide-de-camp to Queen Elizabeth II (HonADC).

Military offices
Preceded by Dame Mary Colvin	Director, Women's Royal Army Corps; 1961 to 1964	Succeeded by Dame Joan Henderson
