= Reginald Tyrwhitt =

Royal Navy Admiral of the Fleet (1870–1951)

Admiral of the Fleet Sir Reginald Tyrwhitt Bt GCB DSO
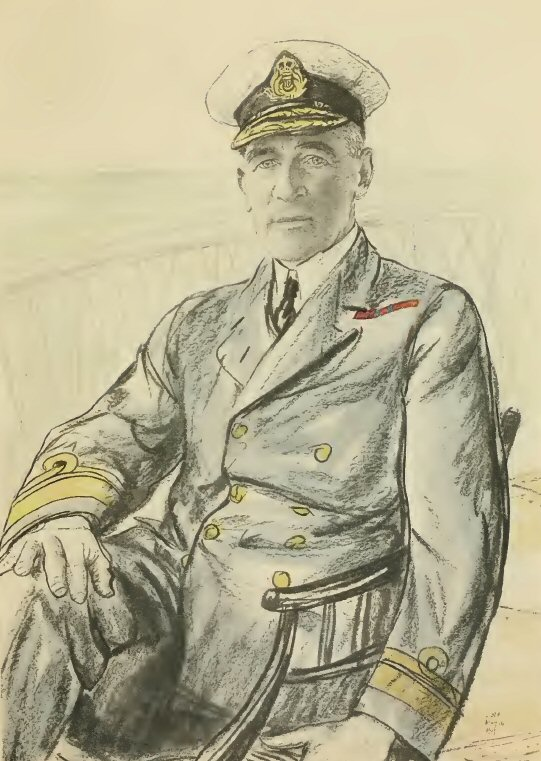
- Portrait of Tyrwhitt, by Francis Dodd
- Born: 10 May 1870; Oxford, Oxfordshire
- Died: 30 May 1951 (aged 81); Sandhurst, Kent
- Relatives: Dame Mary Tyrwhitt (daughter); Sir St John Tyrwhitt, 2nd Baronet (son)
- Military career
- Allegiance: United Kingdom
- Branch: Royal Navy
- Service years: 1883–1945
- Rank: Admiral of the Fleet
- Commands: Nore Command (1930–33); China Station (1926–29); Coast of Scotland (1923–25); 3rd Light Cruiser Squadron (1920–22); Senior Naval Officer, Gibraltar (1919); Harwich Force (1914–18); Destroyer Flotillas of the First Fleet (1913); 2nd Destroyer Flotilla (1912); HMS Good Hope (1912); HMS Bacchante (1910–11); 4th Destroyer Flotilla (1909); HMS Skirmisher (1907); HMS Attentive (1906); HMS Waveney (1904); HMS Hart (1896)
- Conflicts: First World War; Battle of Heligoland Bight; Cuxhaven Raid; Battle of Dogger Bank; Zeebrugge Raid
- Awards: Knight Grand Cross of the Order of the Bath; Distinguished Service Order; Commander of the Legion of Honour (France); Croix de Guerre (France); Officer of the Military Order of Savoy (Italy)

Admiral of the Fleet Sir Reginald Yorke Tyrwhitt, 1st Baronet, GCB DSO (/ˈtɪrɪt/; 10 May 1870 – 30 May 1951) was a Royal Navy officer. During the First World War he served as commander of the Harwich Force. He led a supporting naval force of 31 destroyers and two cruisers at the Battle of Heligoland Bight in August 1914, in which action the 1st Battlecruiser Squadron under Sir David Beatty sank three German cruisers and one German destroyer with minimal loss of allied warships. Tyrwhitt also led the British naval forces during the Cuxhaven Raid in December 1914, and at the Battle of Dogger Bank in January 1915, in which action Tyrwhitt again supported Beatty's powerful battlecruiser squadron.

After the war, Tyrwhitt went on to be Senior Naval Officer, Gibraltar, commander of the 3rd Light Cruiser Squadron in the Mediterranean Fleet and then Commander-in-Chief, Coast of Scotland. He also served as Commander-in-Chief, China during a period of disturbances and tension with the Nationalist Government. His last appointment was as Commander-in-Chief, The Nore.

== Naval career ==
=== Early years ===
Born the son of the Rev. Richard St John Tyrwhitt and Caroline Tyrwhitt (née Yorke), Tyrwhitt joined the training ship HMS Britannia as a cadet on 15 July 1883. He was assigned to the battleship HMS Alexandra in the Mediterranean Fleet in August 1885 and, following his promotion to midshipman on 15 December 1885, he was appointed to the cruiser HMS Calypso in the Training Squadron in November 1888. He transferred to the armoured cruiser HMS Australia in 1889 and, following promotion to sub-lieutenant on 14 March 1890, he transferred to the battleship HMS Ajax later that year. He joined the training brig HMS Pilot at Portsmouth in March 1892 and, having been promoted to lieutenant on 25 August 1892, he transferred to the light cruiser HMS Cleopatra on the North America and West Indies Station in late 1892. He became commanding officer of the destroyer HMS Hart in January 1896 and then became first lieutenant on the despatch vessel HMS Surprise in the Mediterranean Fleet in late 1896. He went on to be First Lieutenant in the cruiser HMS Indefatigable on the North America and West Indies Station in December 1899 and, having been promoted to commander on 1 January 1903, he became executive officer in the cruiser HMS Aurora early in 1903.

Tyrwhitt became commanding officer of the destroyer HMS Waveney in 1904, of the scout cruiser HMS Attentive in 1906 and of the scout cruiser HMS Skirmisher in 1907. Promoted to captain on 30 June 1908, he became captain of the 4th Destroyer Flotilla in the cruiser HMS Topaze in August 1909. He went on to be flag captain to the commander of the 6th Cruiser Squadron in the Mediterranean Fleet first in the armoured cruiser HMS Bacchante in September 1910 and then in the armoured cruiser HMS Good Hope in early 1912 before becoming captain of the 2nd Destroyer Flotilla in the scout cruiser HMS Bellona in August 1912. He became commodore of all destroyers in the First Fleet in December 1913.

=== First World War ===
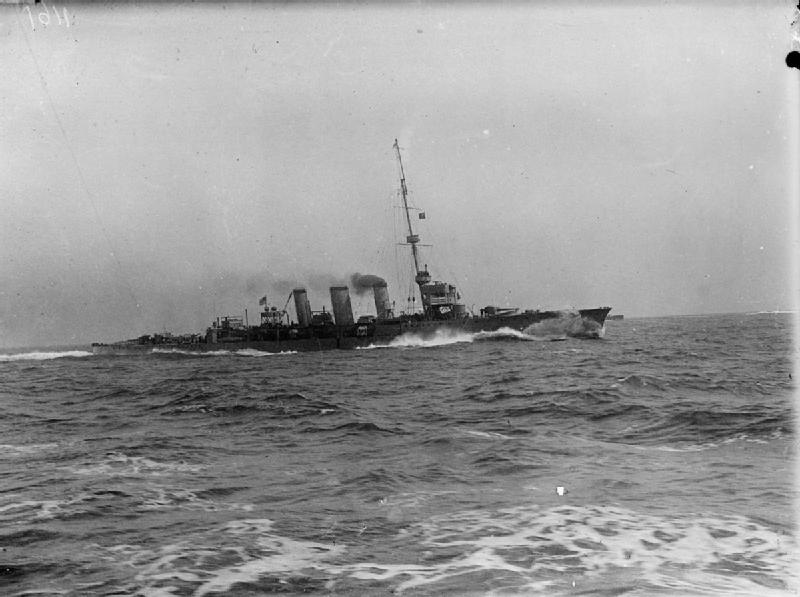
The cruiser HMS Arethusa, Tyrwhitt's flagship during the Battle of Heligoland Bight

Tyrwhitt was given command of the Harwich Force at the start of the First World War flying his broad pendant in the protected cruiser HMS Amethyst. With his flag in the light cruiser HMS Arethusa, Tyrwhitt led a supporting naval force of 31 destroyers and two cruisers at the Battle of Heligoland Bight in August 1914 in which action the 1st Battlecruiser Squadron under Sir David Beatty sank three German cruisers and one German destroyer with minimal loss of allied warships. For this action Tyrwhitt was appointed a Companion of the Order of the Bath on 21 October 1914.

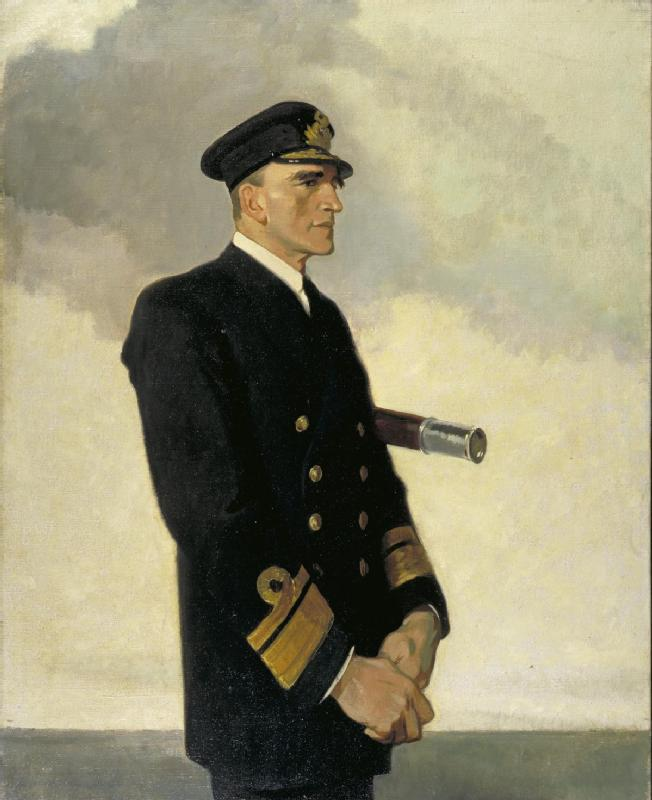
Reginald Tyrwhitt, 1918, by Glyn Philpot

Tyrwhitt also led the British naval forces during the Cuxhaven Raid in December 1914, when British seaplanes destroyed German Zeppelin airships, and at the Battle of Dogger Bank in January 1915, in which action Tyrwhitt again supported Beatty's powerful battlecruiser squadron. During the Battle of Jutland in May 1916, the Admiralty held back Tyrwhitt's forces in case of a German attack on the coast. Tyrwhitt was awarded the Distinguished Service Order on 3 June 1916, appointed a Commander of the French Legion of Honour on 15 September, and made a naval aide-de-camp to the King on 21 May 1917. He was also advanced to Knight Commander of the Order of the Bath on 15 July 1917, and appointed an Officer of the Military Order of Savoy on 11 August.

Tyrwhitt took part in the Zeebrugge Raid and the Ostend Raid on the night of 23 April 1918, for which he was awarded the French Croix de Guerre on 23 July. At the end of the war he accepted the surrender of the German U-boats at Harwich. He was also promoted to rear admiral on 2 December 1919, and created a baronet of Terschelling and of Oxford on 13 December.

=== After the war ===
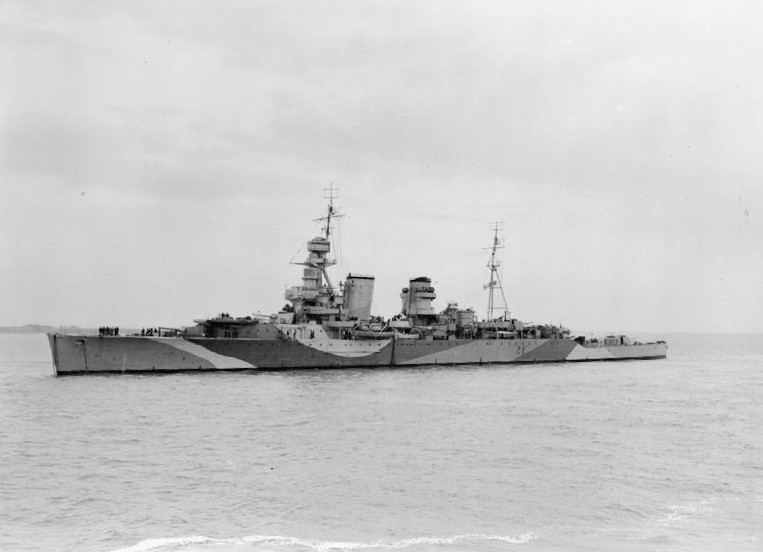
The cruiser, HMS Hawkins, Tyrwhitt's flagship as Commander-in-Chief, China

Tyrwhitt became Senior Naval Officer, Gibraltar in July 1919, commander of the 3rd Light Cruiser Squadron in the Mediterranean Fleet with his flag in the light cruiser HMS Cardiff in 1921 and then Commander-in-Chief, Coast of Scotland in June 1923. Promoted to vice admiral on 18 January 1925, he went on to be Commander-in-Chief, China with his flag in Hawkins in November 1926 during a period of disturbances and tension with the Nationalist Government. Promoted to full admiral on 27 February 1929 and advanced to Knight Grand Cross of the Order of the Bath on 30 July 1929, he went on to be Commander-in-Chief, The Nore in May 1930.

In the aftermath of the Invergordon Mutiny in September 1931, Tyrwhitt was instrumental in preventing Vice-Admiral Frederic Dreyer, the Deputy Chief of the Naval Staff, from taking command of the Atlantic Fleet and ending any hopes Dreyer had of becoming First Sea Lord. Tyrwhitt was appointed First and Principal Naval Aide-de-Camp on 10 October 1932. When he hauled down his flag for the last time in May 1933, Tyrwhitt was the last British flag officer who had served in the First World War to do so. Promoted to Admiral of the Fleet on 31 July 1934, he briefly served in the Home Guard during the Second World War. He died at Ellenden Nursing Home in Sandhurst, Kent on 30 May 1951.

== Family ==
Tyrwhitt married at Donaghmore, County Meath, on 24 February 1903 Angela Corbally, daughter of Matthew J. Corbally, JP, of Rathbeale Hall, Dublin; they had two daughters and a son (Admiral Sir St John Tyrwhitt). The elder daughter, Mary Tyrwhitt, was the last director of the Auxiliary Territorial Service, and first director of the Women's Royal Army Corps.

== Sources ==
- Heathcote, Tony (2002). The British Admirals of the Fleet 1734 – 1995. Pen & Sword Ltd. ISBN 0-85052-835-6.
- Parkinson, J. M. (2004). "Re: The Saint Pierre Disaster, 8 May 1902". Warship International. XLI (1): 45–46. ISSN 0043-0374.
- Temple Patterson, Alfred (1973). Tyrwhitt of the Harwich Force: The Life of Admiral of the Fleet Sir Reginald Tyrwhitt. London: Macdonald and Jane's. ISBN 0-356-04530-7.

Military offices
Preceded by Sir John Green	Commander-in-Chief, Coast of Scotland; 1923–1925	Succeeded by Sir Walter Cowan
Preceded by Sir Edwyn Alexander-Sinclair	Commander-in-Chief, China; 1926–1928	Succeeded by Sir Arthur Waistell
Preceded by Sir Edwyn Alexander-Sinclair	Commander-in-Chief, The Nore; 1930–1933	Succeeded by Sir Hugh Tweedie
Honorary titles
Preceded by Sir Hubert Brand	First and Principal Naval Aide-de-Camp; 1932–1934	Succeeded by Sir John Kelly
Baronetage of the United Kingdom
New creation	Baronet (of Terschelling and of Oxford); 1919–1951	Succeeded by St John Tyrwhitt
