= Mary Tyrwhitt =

British Army officer

Dame Mary Tyrwhitt
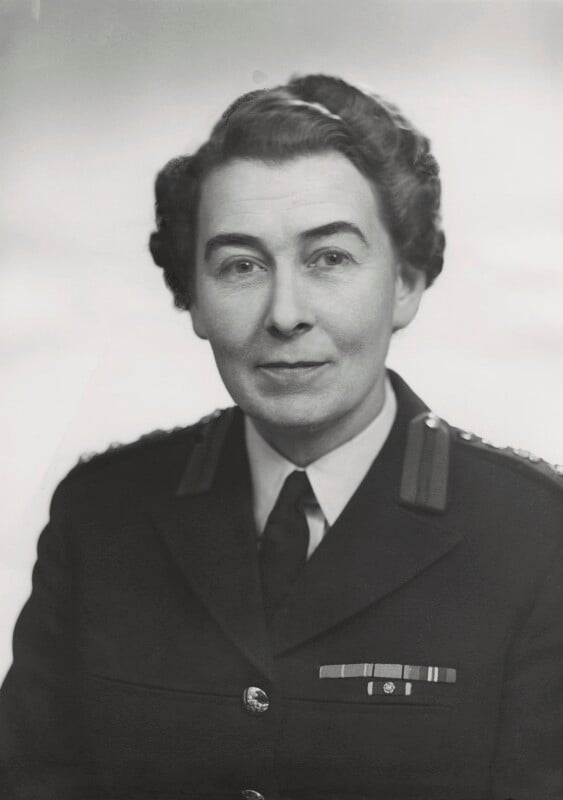
- Tyrwhitt in 1951
- Born: 22 December 1903; Dublin, Ireland
- Died: 18 March 1997 (aged 93); Warwickshire, England
- Relatives: Admiral of the Fleet Sir Reginald Tyrwhitt, 1st Baronet (father)
- Military career
- Allegiance: United Kingdom
- Branch: British Army
- Rank: Brigadier
- Nickname: Bovvy
- Commands: Auxiliary Territorial Service; Women's Royal Army Corps
- Conflicts: Second World War
- Awards: Dame Commander of the Order of the British Empire; Territorial Decoration

Brigadier Dame Mary Joan Caroline Tyrwhitt, DBE, TD (22 December 1903 – 18 March 1997) was a British Army officer. She was the last director of the Auxiliary Territorial Service (ATS) and the first director of the Women's Royal Army Corps (WRAC) when it was established on 1 February 1949.

Her father was Admiral of the Fleet Sir Reginald Tyrwhitt, 1st Baronet, a Royal Navy officer.

== Death ==
Brigadier Dame Mary Tyrwhitt died in 1997, aged 93, unmarried.

Military offices
Preceded by Dame Leslie Whateley	Director, Auxiliary Territorial Service; 1946–1949	Post abolished
New post	Director, Women's Royal Army Corps; 1949–1950	Succeeded by Dame Mary Coulshed
