= Anne Field =

British Army officer (1926–2011)

Brigadier Anne Field CB CBE ADC Hon
- Born: Anne Hodgson; 4 April 1926
- Died: 25 June 2011 (aged 85)
- Spouse: Anthony Field (1956 – 1961)
- Military career
- Allegiance: United Kingdom
- Branch: Auxiliary Territorial Service; Women's Royal Army Corps
- Service years: 1947–1982
- Rank: Brigadier
- Service number: 399675

Brigadier Anne Field CB CBE ADC Hon (née Hodgson; 4 April 1926 – 25 June 2011) was a senior British military officer. She served as Director of the Women's Royal Army Corps from 1977 to 1982.

== Military career ==
Field began her military career as a private in the Auxiliary Territorial Service (ATS). She had joined the ATS in September 1947, having been exempt from conscription during World War II because she had been a university student. Following training, her first posting was as a clerical instructor with the rank of lance corporal. She was selected for officer training and benefited from having instructors that had seen active service during the war. She was commissioned in December 1948 as a second subaltern (equivalent to second lieutenant).

Her first posting as an officer was as a platoon commander based in the United Kingdom. On 1 February 1949, the ATS became the Women's Royal Army Corps (WRAC). Therefore, she became an officer of the WRAC and, for the first time, became subject to military law. She had applied for overseas service upon her commission. The opportunity came for this during the Malayan Emergency (1948 to 1960) and she was posted to Singapore. From 1951 to 1953, she served there as officer commanding of the 4th Independent Company, WRAC; a unit of 400 female personnel.

She returned to England at the end of her posting to Singapore. In 1953, she attended a six-month course at the WRAC Staff College, Frimley Park. Having completed the course, she was posted to the Staff Duties branch of the War Office. Her next posting were as a staff officer of the London University WRAC Officer Training Corps, and then as adjutant of 317 (Scottish) TA Battalion WRAC.

In 1961, she was promoted to major and appointed chief instructor at the WRAC Centre, Guildford. In 1963, after two years as an instructor, she was posted as a grade 2 staff officer to HQ Middle East Command in Aden. The British Colony of Aden had become the State of Aden but there was an insurgency against British rule that became the Aden Emergency. She was responsible for the welfare of soldiers and their families based in the region. She made a point of visiting troops in even the most dangerous places, which won her approval from her male colleagues. She had the additional role of notifying the families of casualties and her experience of the conditions that they had faced gave her letters authenticity.

After a spell in Germany, she was promoted to colonel in December 1971, and appointed as Commandant of the WRAC College, Camberley. In 1975, she was appointed as Deputy Director WRAC. In 1977 she was promoted to Brigadier and appointed as Director WRAC.

== Later life ==
Having served in Aden in the 1960s during the Aden Emergency, she became patron of the Aden Veterans' Association in 2002 She died on 25 June 2011, aged 85 and is buried in the churchyard of St Kentigern's parish church, Crosthwaite, Keswick, Cumbria.

== Personal life ==
On 17 March 1956, she married Captain Anthony Field (born 1927). He was a British Army officer who at the time of their marriage was serving in West Germany with the British Army of the Rhine. They did not have any children and divorced in 1961 after five years of marriage.

== Honours and decorations ==
On 1 June 1977, Field was appointed Honorary Aide-de-Camp (ADC Hon) to Queen Elizabeth II. In the 1980 New Year Honours, she was appointed Companion of the Order of the Bath (CB). This honour was in recognition of her role as head of the WRAC, but up until ten years previously the directors were made dames upon appointment. She was subsequently appointed CBE in the 1996 New Year Honours.
