= St John Tyrwhitt =

Royal Navy Admiral (1905–1961)

Admiral Sir St John Tyrwhitt Bt KCB DSO DSC*
- Born: 18 April 1905
- Died: 10 October 1961 (aged 56); Queen Alexandra Military Hospital, London
- Relatives: Sir Reginald Tyrwhitt, 1st Baronet (father); Dame Mary Tyrwhitt (sister)
- Military career
- Allegiance: United Kingdom
- Branch: Royal Navy
- Service years: 1919–1961
- Rank: Admiral
- Commands: Second Sea Lord; HMS Newcastle; HMS Tartar; HMS Juno; HMS Defender
- Conflicts: Second World War; Korean War
- Awards: Knight Commander of the Order of the Bath; Distinguished Service Order; Distinguished Service Cross & Bar

Admiral Sir St John Reginald Joseph Tyrwhitt, 2nd Baronet, KCB, DSO, DSC & Bar (18 April 1905 – 10 October 1961) was a senior Royal Navy officer who served as Second Sea Lord and Chief of Naval Personnel from 1959 to 1961.

== Naval career ==
Born the son of Admiral of the Fleet Sir Reginald Tyrwhitt and Angela Mary Corbally, Tyrwhitt joined the Royal Navy in 1919. He served in the Second World War as commanding officer of the destroyer HMS Defender from 1939 and then as commander of the destroyer HMS Juno from 1940 until it was sunk by Italian bombers 30 nautical miles off Crete in 1941. He was given command of the destroyer HMS Tartar from 1942.

After inheriting his father's baronetcy in 1951, Tyrwhitt assumed command of the cruiser HMS Newcastle during the Korean War then became flag officer (flotillas) to the Indian Navy in 1956, and chief of staff to the commander-in-chief of the Allied Forces Mediterranean in 1958. After promotion to vice-admiral on 3 November 1958, he was appointed Second Sea Lord and Chief of Naval Personnel in 1959. He was appointed a Knight Commander of the Order of the Bath in the 1961 New Year Honours and was promoted to full admiral on 11 September 1961. He died at Queen Alexandra Military Hospital, London, shortly after leaving office, on 10 October 1961, aged 56.

== Family ==
In 1944, Tyrwhitt married Nancy Veronica Gilbey; they had two sons and a daughter.

Military offices
Preceded by Sir Deric Holland-Martin	Second Sea Lord; 1959–1961	Succeeded by Sir Royston Wright
Preceded by F A Ballance	Flag Officer (Flotillas) Indian Fleet; 1955–1956	Succeeded by Ram Dass Katari
Baronetage of the United Kingdom
Preceded by Reginald Tyrwhitt	Baronet (of Terschelling and of Oxford); 1951–1961	Succeeded by Reginald Tyrwhitt
