= Tyrwhitt baronets of Terschelling and Oxford (1919) =

Escutcheon of the Tyrwhitt baronets of Terschelling and Oxford

The Tyrwhitt baronetcy, of Terschelling and of Oxford, was created in the Baronetage of the United Kingdom on 13 December 1919 for the naval commander Reginald Tyrwhitt. He was a descendant of John Tyrwhitt, brother of the first Baronet of the 1808 creation. In 1934 Tyrwhitt was promoted to Admiral of the Fleet. The second Baronet was an admiral in the Royal Navy and served as Second Sea Lord from 1959 to 1961.

== Tyrwhitt baronets, of Terschelling and Oxford (1919) ==
- Sir Reginald Yorke Tyrwhitt, 1st Baronet (1870–1951)
- Sir St John Reginald Joseph Tyrwhitt, 2nd Baronet (1905–1961)
- Sir Reginald Thomas Newman Tyrwhitt, 3rd Baronet (born 1947)

The heir apparent is the present holder's son Robert St John Hildyard Tyrwhitt (born 1987).
