= Sheila Heaney =

British Army officer (1917–1991)

- Heaney as a colonel (1967–1970)
- Born: 11 June 1917; Liverpool, England
- Died: 1 February 1991 (aged 73); Edinburgh, Scotland
- Military career
- Allegiance: British Army
- Branch: Auxiliary Territorial Service & Women's Royal Army Corps
- Service years: 1939–1973
- Rank: Director
- Conflicts: Second World War; 1947–1948 civil war in Mandatory Palestine
- Awards: Member of the Order of the British Empire, Companion of the Order of the Bath

Sheila Anne Elizabeth Heaney, CB, MBE, TD (11 June 1917 – 1 February 1991) was a British Army officer. She joined the Auxiliary Territorial Service shortly before the Second World War and served in the UK, East Africa and Palestine. In 1949, she transferred to the newly formed Women's Royal Army Corps (WRAC). Heaney rose through the ranks and was appointed a Member of the Order of the British Empire. She was promoted to the rank of brigadier, appointed director of the WRAC and aide-de-camp to Queen Elizabeth II in 1970. As part of her role as director Heaney visited the United States to study the integration of women into their army and recommended that the process proceed in the UK on a more gradual basis. She instituted changes to make it easier for women in the British Army to choose their branch of service. After her retirement in 1973, she lived in Edinburgh where she volunteered with the Women's Royal Voluntary Service and supported a local hospice.

== Early life ==
Sheila Anne Elizabeth Heaney was born in Liverpool on 11 June 1917. She was the second of four children of Anne (née Summers), an American, and Francis Heaney, a surgeon. As a child she was a keen horse rider and hunt follower and holidayed with her family in Cornwall, the Lake District and Ireland.

Heaney developed an interest in sociology after visiting the poorer parts of London with her father on his work. She studied at Huyton College and graduated from the University of Liverpool in 1938. Heaney then attended the Loughborough College of Technology before finding work at the human resources department of retailer Marks & Spencer.

== Auxiliary Territorial Service ==
As tensions increased in the lead-up to the Second World War Heaney joined the British Army's Auxiliary Territorial Service (ATS) and encouraged her co-workers to join up. On 26 January 1939, she was appointed company assistant (equivalent to second lieutenant) and served in the 1st West Lancashire Platoon. Heaney afterwards spent a year at the ATS training centre before being appointed second in command of the Salisbury Plain District Group. When the ATS reformed its rank structure on 30 May 1941 she transferred to the rank of second subaltern (equivalent to her previous rank).

From January to April 1944 Heaney attended the United States Army Command and General Staff College in Fort Leavenworth, Kansas. Afterwards she carried out administrative work on a posting to British East Africa. From 1946 she served in Mandatory Palestine, a posting that included the period of the 1947-48 civil war. Heaney transferred from her war substantive commission to a permanent commission on 1 January 1947 and was promoted to junior commander (equivalent to captain) the following month. On 20 March 1947, she was awarded the Efficiency Medal for long service, at which point she held the rank of temporary senior commander (equivalent to major).

Heaney returned to the UK in July 1948 and was entitled to the War Medal 1939–1945 and the General Service Medal with Palestine clasp for her service. She served at the ATS headquarters for three months before being appointed deputy assistant adjutant-general at the War Office.

== Women's Royal Army Corps ==
Heaney decided on a permanent career in the army in 1949 and transferred to the Women's Royal Army Corps (WRAC) when it was founded on 1 February 1949. She transferred initially in the rank of subaltern (equivalent to lieutenant), with seniority from 2 September 1941, but was immediately promoted to junior commander (equivalent to captain), with seniority from 2 September 1945. Heaney was awarded the Efficiency Decoration on 13 April 1951. By this time the WRAC had adopted the British Army's officer ranks and she held the substantive rank of captain and temporary rank of major. During 1952 Heaney served on the headquarters of 79th Anti-Aircraft Brigade of the Royal Artillery and on 2 September her rank of major was made permanent.

From 1952 to 1955 Heaney served as a trainer in Western Command and in 1955 was posted to 1 Independent Company WRAC. She was appointed a Member of the Order of the British Empire on 9 June 1955. Heaney spent two years with 140 Provost Company before being posted to the War Office in September 1959. From July 1961 she served at the WRAC School of Instruction and from April 1962 with the organisation's medical unit, followed by a stint in the records office. Heaney was promoted to the rank of lieutenant colonel on 24 February 1963 and from October 1965 served as assistant director, WRAC at Northern Command. She was promoted to colonel on 30 June 1967 and from July served as assistant adjutant-general at the Ministry of Defence.

Heaney was promoted to the rank of brigadier on 30 June 1970 and was appointed director of the WRAC on 1 September. On 29 September she was appointed an aide-de-camp to Queen Elizabeth II. Heaney visited the United States in 1972 to study the ongoing integration of women into its army. She advocated similar change in the United Kingdom but on a more gradual basis; full integration in the British Army was achieved, and the WRAC disbanded, in 1992. One key change Heaney was able to introduce was the ability of women in the British Army to choose their arm of service or branch. Heaney was appointed a Companion of the Order of the Bath on 2 June 1973 and retired on 18 June.

== Later life ==
After retirement Heaney, who never married, moved to Edinburgh to look after her widowed mother. She served on the military education committee of the Edinburgh and Heriot-Watt University Officers' Training Corps and joined the Women's Royal Voluntary Service (WRVS). Heaney helped the WRVS with delivery of meals on wheels and assisted the elderly with shopping and travel. She later became WRVS district organiser for Edinburgh and was its chairman for Scotland from spring 1977.

Heaney became disabled in later life, possibly as a result of eating poisonous mushrooms while serving with the army in Kenya. She retired from the WRVS in 1981 and afterwards served on the committee of St Columba's Hospice in Edinburgh. A heavy smoker throughout her life, Heaney developed lung cancer and died in the hospice on 1 February 1991. She was cremated and her funeral was held at St James's Episcopal Church in Goldenacre, Edinburgh on 6 February 1991.
