= Joan Henderson =

British Army officer (1915–2018)

Dame Joan Evelyn Clara "Joanna" Henderson, Mrs Kelleher DBE (24 December 1915 – 23 September 2018) was a British Army officer who was the highest-ranking officer in the Women's Royal Army Corps (WRAC) from 1964 to 1967. She was preceded by Brigadier Dame Jean Rivett-Drake (1961–1964) and succeeded by Brigadier Dame Mary Anderson (1967–1970). Holding the rank of Brigadier, she retired from the WRAC on 22 September 1967.

== Biography ==
Henderson, always known as "Joanna", was born in London to Scottish parents. Her father, Kenneth Henderson, was a barrister originally from Stonehaven. She was educated privately in Surrey and Switzerland. Upon the outbreak of WWII, she began voluntary hospital work. Two years later, in 1941, she did her training with the WRAC in Inverness and was commissioned into the Auxiliary Territorial Service as a lance corporal four months later.

She was appointed an Honorary Aide de Camp to Queen Elizabeth II on 15 September 1964 and became a Dame Commander of the Order of the British Empire in the Queen's birthday honours of 1965.

She met Brigadier Mortimer Kelleher MC, a medical officer. They corresponded for many years before marrying in 1970.

Military offices
Preceded by Dame Jean Rivett-Drake	Director, Women's Royal Army Corps; 1964 to 1967	Succeeded by Dame Mary Anderson
