= Eileen Nolan =

English Women's Royal Army Corps director

Brigadier Eileen Joan Nolan CB (19 June 1920 – 29 December 2005) was a former director of the Women's Royal Army Corps (WRAC).

== Early years ==
Eileen Joan Nolan was born at Bournville, Birmingham. Her father was a World War I veteran, later employed by Cadbury's as a technical adviser. She attended King's Norton Grammar School on a scholarship. In 1942, she joined the Auxiliary Territorial Service (ATS) and was posted to Halifax, Yorkshire. For much of the war she remained in the ATS's training branch. In early 1945 she joined the Officer Cadet Training Unit and earned her commission; she elected to remain in the military, becoming a career officer in the Army, and rising to the rank of Brigadier.

== Positions held ==
- Junior commander (Captain at "B" Company 12 Battalion, Prince's Gate, Kensington; 1946)
- Staff Captain Q (quartering branch), War Office, responsible for moving freight to and from the Middle East
- Major, WRAC (at Tripoli, Libya; 1957)
- Home posting, WRAC (1963; Stanmore)
- Officer training wing, WRAC (at Camberley)
- Lieutenant-Colonel, WRAC (1967; posted to Singapore, where she commanded the WRAC; remit also covered Malaysia, Hong Kong, Saigon and Bangkok)
- WRAC College (1981; Sandhurst; women cadets took up residence in 1984, integral step in integrating women in the Regular Army)

== Retirement ==
Nolan retired as director in 1977 and was appointed a Companion of the Order of the Bath.

== Death ==
Eileen Nolan died on 29 December 2005, aged 85 at Crowthorne, Berkshire, although her death was not announced until February 2006. She never married.
