= Mary Colvin =

Dame Mary Colvin DBE TD
- Born: Mary Katherine Rosamund Colvin; 25 October 1907; Shermanbury, West Sussex, England
- Died: 23 September 1988 (aged 80); Rutland, England
- Military career
- Branch: British Army
- Rank: Brigadier
- Commands: Women's Royal Army Corps
- Awards: Order of the British Empire; Territorial Decoration

Dame Mary Katherine Rosamund Colvin DBE TD (25 October 1907 – 23 September 1988) was a British Army officer who was director of the Women's Royal Army Corps and president of the British Horse Society. She held the rank of Brigadier.

== Family ==
Colvin was born into a military family, one of four children and the only daughter of the Boer War veteran Lieutenant Colonel Forrester Farnell Colvin (CBE, MC, DL; died 16 February 1936) and Isabella Katherine McClintock-Bunbury (28 December 1874 – 30 March 1963), who married on 26 July 1894. They lived at Morley House, Shermanbury Grange, Brighton Road, Shermanbury, Horsham, West Sussex. She was a cousin of Michael Colvin, a Conservative Member of Parliament.

== Career ==
Colvin travelled widely as a young woman, to South Africa and India. She joined the First Aid Nursing Yeomanry in 1938, transferring to the Auxiliary Territorial Service when World War II commenced. She spent most of the war as a driver, then commanded a Central Ordnance Depot Auxiliary Territorial Service (ATS) Group at Weedon, Northamptonshire (1943–44). Immediately after the end of hostilities with Germany, she was posted to Hamburg to help oversee its transition to democracy and build up the local council and basic services such as housing. After two years of throwing herself into this work, she was awarded an OBE, but had to return to Britain to be nearer to her ailing and elderly relatives.

She supervised the transition of the ATS into the Women's Royal Army Corps (WRAC), including moving its officer training school to Hindhead and bringing the training closer to that of male recruits. Female recruitment was low by 1954, so she was appointed to reverse the trend; designing a popular uniform for officers was part of her strategy. After more postings to Scotland and Eastern Command, in 1957 she was appointed WRAC director, still not yet 50, and two years later was elevated to Dame Commander of the Order of the British Empire. In 1961, she went to Copenhagen as Britain's main delegate to the inaugural NATO meeting of the women's services; her international peers elected her their spokeswoman. That year she retired, after 23 years' service.

She devoted much of the next 25 years to the British Horse Society, working her way up from dressage judge to president. She hunted with the Blackmore Vale and lent her indoor riding school to the Rutland club (which did not have its own premises).

She was lady in waiting to Mary, the Princess Royal, the Controller Commandant of the WRAC, and accompanied her to Canada in 1962.

== Death ==
Colvin died on 23 September 1988, aged 80, in Rutland. She never married. Her personal papers are at the National Archives, along with those of other British military women, such as Dame Katharine Furse, Dame Rachel Crowdy, and Brigadier Dame Mary Coulshed.
