= Helen Meechie =

British general (1938–2000)

Brigadier Helen Meechie CBE
- Born: 19 January 1938; Dundee Scotland
- Died: 24 August 2000 (aged 62)
- Education: University of St Andrews
- Military career
- Branch: Women's Royal Army Corps
- Rank: Brigadier

Helen Guild Meechie CBE (19 January 1938 - 24 August 2000) was a British Army officer who was Director of the Women's Royal Army Corps and became the highest ranking woman in the British Army as a brigadier.

== Early life ==
Meechie was born in Dundee, and attended the Morgan Academy, and the University of St Andrews, earning an MA in modern languages. Subsequently, she gained a teaching diploma from Dundee College of Education, after which she decided to join the Army's graduate entry scheme, and was commissioned into the Women's Royal Army Corps (WRAC) in 1960, at age 22.

== Career ==
Meechie moved through the ranks, obtaining notable milestones. She was the first woman to graduate from Royal Military Academy Sandhurst, the first woman to attend both the National Defence College, and Royal College of Defence Studies, promoted to the rank of lieutenant-colonel.

She was posted in Britain, Cyprus and Hong Kong from 1961 to 1976. She served three years in personnel at the Ministry of Defence, before being appointed Commander WRAC Army of the Rhine, near the Berlin Wall.

In 1982 she was appointed Director of the WRAC, the top job for a woman in the British Army, and made an Honorary Aide to the Queen. In 1986 she retired from the WRAC, and was awarded a CBE. She also received an honorary doctorate from Dundee University, and was made an honorary colonel of Tayforth UOTC, which trains officer cadets from several universities in the east of Scotland. Subsequently, she returned to the Royal College of Defence Studies as Deputy Director-General of Personnel Services, retiring from the Army in 1991.

After retirement, she was involved in the WRAC Association, serving as vice-president and chair. She was made a Freeman of the City of London, and an enthusiastic golfer, set up the WRAC Golf Society.
