= Margot Marshall =

British soldier

Margot Marshall

Margot Marshall (1 May 1918 – 21 September 2010) was the first British woman officer to land in occupied Europe after D-Day. A member of the Auxiliary Territorial Service (ATS) during World War II, she later was involved in organising the British delegation at the Potsdam Conference.

== Early life ==
Born as Margaret Campbell Marshall in Fowey in Cornwall in 1918, she was one of four children of her father, who died when she was aged 3. Her mother never remarried and shuttled her family between their homes in Gloucestershire, Surrey and Switzerland. Marshall grew up with a passion for all country pursuits, and she became an enthusiastic horsewoman. She gained a good working knowledge of French and German. Because of her peripatetic upbringing she had attended seven schools by the time she gained her School Certificate.

== Military service ==
On leaving school she worked as a social worker in a Dr Barnardo's Home at Barkingside. On the declaration of war in 1939 the children in the home were evacuated to Colchester, and Marshall joined the Auxiliary Territorial Service (ATS). In 1939 she was serving with 5th (London) Motor Company based at Tendring Hall near Colchester. Here Marshall initially served as a driver, ferrying senior officers around secret sites close to Southwold in Suffolk. This was followed by a period as an ambulance driver based at Colchester Military Hospital in Colchester Garrison. Following training at an Officers' Training Corps (OTC) unit in Edinburgh Marshall received a commission and was posted to Anti-Aircraft Command, initially at 584 Battery RA near Sheffield and after, as a Junior Commander (Captain) to 606 Battery RA on the Sussex coast, where she saw much action. For a short period she commanded the battery while her senior officer was on leave.

In March 1944 Marshall requested an overseas posting, and offered to accept a demotion in rank if this was necessary. Reverting to the rank of Subaltern, she joined the 1st Continental Group ATS group, attached to HQ 21st Army Group. In early June 1944 Subaltern Marshall was ordered to attend a secret meeting at the Lyric Theatre in Hammersmith where she was among the officers being briefed about details for D-Day by General Bernard Montgomery himself.

=== Landing in France ===
Following her appointment as Officer in Charge of an elite advance group of 30 members of 1st Continental Group ATS, in late July 1944 Marshall and her group crossed the Channel in secret in a tank carrier which landed on the beach at Courseulles-sur-Mer - the site of Juno Beach. This made Marshall the first British woman officer to land in occupied Europe after D-Day. At Courseulles-sur-Mer Marshall and her group set up camp among the ruins of Bayeux, near to the front line. The remaining 482 women of 1st Continental Group, made up of three companies including cooks, drivers and Marshall's E Company of clerks, joined the advance party about a month later.

September 1944 saw the entire camp move from Normandy to Brussels where they received a heroes' welcome. In Brussels Marshall was billeted in a building which only a few days before had been the headquarters of the local Gestapo.

In Spring 1945 senior Allied and Wehrmacht officers met to discuss the worsening food shortages in the northern Netherlands. A temporary truce having been agreed, Marshall, appointed Junior Commander, was posted to 3rd Continental Group ATS, Netherlands District. Here she formed K Company to obtain and distribute supplies of food to the starving Dutch population.

Being driven around the Netherlands in her staff car could be perilous, and once Marshall found herself dangling in it over a river, her male driver not having seen that the retreating Germans had detonated a bridge. On being told of her close shave, General Alexander Galloway offered to allow her to travel in his private aeroplane. Marshall went to the concentration camp at Bergen-Belsen shortly after it had been liberated. This experience left a lasting impression on her. In the camp hospital she found a boy whose family believed him to be dead. She was able to find his family in Rotterdam and deliver a letter to them from him.

=== Potsdam Conference ===
During the preparations for the Potsdam Conference Marshall received a telegram asking her to report to Bad Oeynhausen. Here she was ordered to put together a temporary company to take care of the British delegation at the conference. Having personally chosen about 140 volunteers from the Auxiliary Territorial Service, Marshall flew by Dakota to Berlin where she joined the Cabinet Office team, and for five weeks supervised her team at Potsdam. Among her duties was finding suitable accommodation for the British personnel. She was in a box during the Berlin Victory Parade in September 1945. Marshall was demobilised from the Army in April 1946.

== Later life ==
In 1946 Marshall married her long-time admirer Major Vincent John Cochran Cooper (1913–2006). A month after the marriage the couple sailed for India, where John Cooper had been posted. The couple had four children: Michael, and twins Timothy and Joanna followed by James. At their birth in 1950 the twins were the heaviest recorded British twins at 4.5 and 4.3 kilograms respectively.

After her husband left the Army in 1958 the family moved to Sussex, where John Cooper ran a ship chandlers. Despite her seasickness Marshall accepted her husband's passion for boats. On his retirement from the chandlers the couple would spend their summer holidays sailing in the Mediterranean before settling in Anglesey. Here they supported the Royal National Lifeboat Institution (RNLI), John Cooper as Secretary and Margot Marshall as a fundraiser. In 2010 she was awarded the RNLI's gold medal.

Margaret Campbell Cooper died in Horndean Hants on 21st September 2010 aged 92.

Her collection of 65 wartime photographs are held by the National Army Museum, as is an archive of 38 papers relating to her military career.
