= Jean Knox =

British Baroness (1908–1993)

Chief Controller Jean Knox CBE
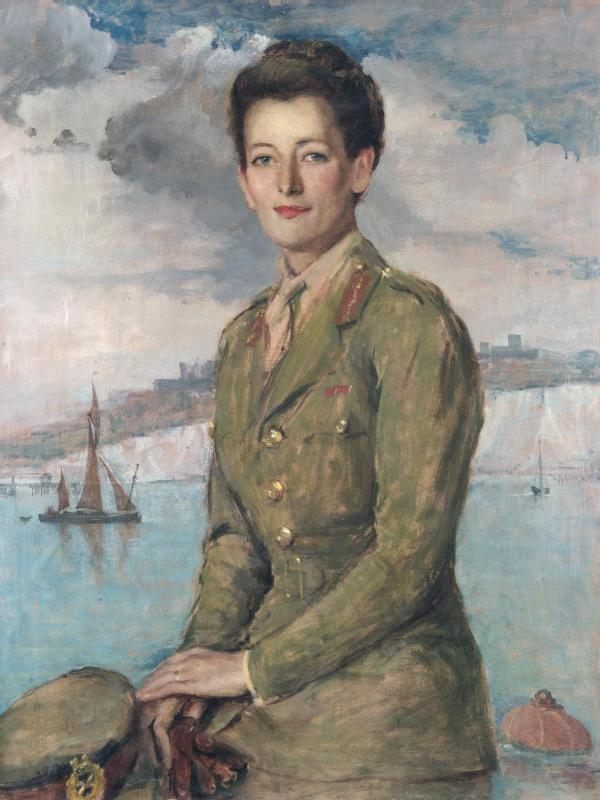
- Portrait by Neville Lytton
- Born: Jean Marcia Leith-Marshall; 14 August 1908
- Died: 13 December 1993 (aged 85)
- Military career
- Allegiance: United Kingdom
- Branch: Auxiliary Territorial Service
- Service years: 1938–1943
- Rank: Chief Controller
- Commands: Auxiliary Territorial Service (1941–43)
- Conflicts: Second World War
- Awards: Commander of the Order of the British Empire

Jean Marcia Montagu, Baroness Swaythling, CBE (née Leith-Marshall; 14 August 1908 – 13 December 1993), first married name Knox, was Director of the Auxiliary Territorial Service from July 1941 to October 1943.

== Early life ==
She was born on 14 August 1908 to G. G. Leith-Marshall. Before the Second World War, she lived in Leicestershire and was a housewife. She had had no other job pre-war.

== Military service ==
Knox joined the Auxiliary Territorial Service in October 1938, almost a year before the outbreak of the Second World War, and undertook kitchen duties. She became a company commander in the 2nd Herts Company. On 30 May 1941, she was given a commission in the ATS in the rank of second subaltern, equivalent to second lieutenant. In April 1941, she was promoted to senior commandant (equivalent to major) and appointed Inspector of the ATS. In that role, she inspected every ATS command and had a seat on the ATS Council.

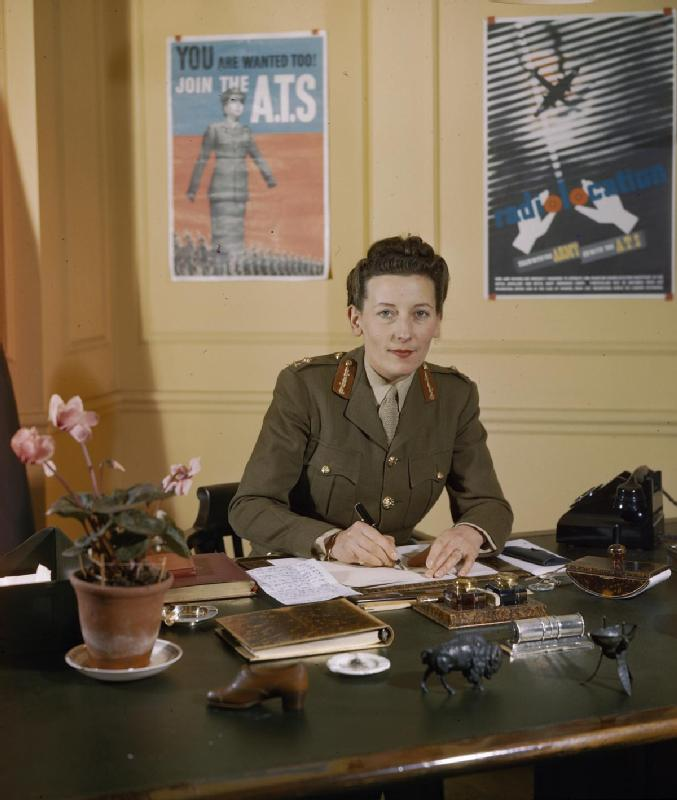
As the Director of the Auxiliary Territorial Service.

Knox was appointed Director, Auxiliary Territorial Service on 21 July 1941. She was given the acting rank of chief controller (equivalent to major general), while holding the war substantive rank of senior commander. This made her the world's youngest general at that time. One of her first actions as Director was to design a new, well fitting uniform for all ranks of the ATS. She was promoted to war substantive controller (equivalent to colonel) and made temporary chief controller on 21 July 1942. She travelled to Canada in September 1942 to inspect the Canadian Women's Army Corps and assisted in its recruiting campaign. She returned to the UK in November following the seven-week trip.

Knox was appointed Commander of the Order of the British Empire in the 1943 New Year Honours. She received the insignia of the order at an investiture ceremony at Buckingham Palace from King George VI. She relinquished the appointment of Director, Auxiliary Territorial Service on 30 October 1943, for health reasons. She relinquished the temporary rank of chief controller and relinquished her commission on 12 December 1943, thereby retiring in the rank of war substantive controller.

== Later life ==
For six weeks in 1948, Knox was managing director of Peter Jones, Sloane Square, Chelsea, London. She gave no reason for her resignation in April 1948, but the department store described her appointment as a 'trial run'.

Knox died on 13 December 1993, aged 85.

== Personal life ==
In 1935 she married Squadron Leader George Ronald Meldrum Knox, the son of Lieutenant Colonel James Meldrum Knox, with whom she had one daughter. They were divorced before 1945. In 1945, she married Stuart Albert Samuel Montagu, 3rd Baron Swaythling, in Southampton.

Military offices
Preceded by Dame Helen Gwynne-Vaughan	Director, Auxiliary Territorial Service; 1941–1943	Succeeded by Dame Leslie Whateley
