= Women's Royal Army Corps =

- Cap badge of the Women's Royal Army Corps
- Active: 1949–1992
- Country: United Kingdom
- Allegiance: United Kingdom
- Branch: British Army
- Role: Support services
- Garrison/HQ: Guildford, Surrey
- Mottos: Suaviter in modo, fortiter in re (Gentle in manner, resolute in deed)
- Colours: None
- March: Quick: Lass of Richmond Hill, Early One Morning; Slow: Greensleeves
- Anniversaries: Corps Day (1 February)

The Women's Royal Army Corps (WRAC; sometimes pronounced acronymically as /ˈræk/, a term unpopular with its members) was the corps to which all women in the British Army belonged from 1949 to 1992 except medical, dental and veterinary officers and chaplains, who belonged to the same corps as the men; the Ulster Defence Regiment, which recruited women from 1973, and nurses, who belonged to Queen Alexandra's Royal Army Nursing Corps.

== History ==
The WRAC was formed on 1 February 1949, by Army Order 6, as the successor to the Auxiliary Territorial Service (ATS) that had been founded in 1938. For much of its existence, its members performed administrative and other support tasks. In March 1952 the ranks of the WRAC, which had previously been Subaltern, Junior Commander, Senior Commander and Controller were harmonised with the rest of the British Army.

In 1974, two soldiers of the corps were killed by the Provisional IRA in the Guildford pub bombings.

In October 1990 WRAC officers employed with other corps were transferred to those corps and in April 1992 the WRAC was disbanded and its remaining members transferred to the Corps they served with. Those who served with the Royal Army Pay Corps, the Corps of Royal Military Police, the Military Provost Staff Corps, the Royal Army Educational Corps, the Army Legal Corps and the Staff Clerks from the Royal Army Ordnance Corps were transferred to the newly formed Adjutant General's Corps. The post of Director WRAC, which carried the rank of Brigadier, was also abolished and it was seven years before a woman, Brigadier Patricia Purves, again reached that rank.

== Senior posts ==
The highest rank available to a serving officer was brigadier, held by the Director WRAC, although the Controller-Commandant, a member of the Royal Family, held a higher honorary rank. Princess Mary held the post from 1949 to her death in 1965 (beginning as a major general and being promoted general on 23 November 1956) and the Duchess of Kent held it from 1967 to 1992 (with the rank of Major-General).

== List of directors WRAC ==
Directors of the WRAC were:

- Brigadier Dame Mary Tyrwhitt, 1949–1950
- Brigadier Dame Mary Coulshed, 1950–1954
- Brigadier Dame Mary Railton, 1954–1957
- Brigadier Dame Mary Colvin, 1957–1961
- Brigadier Dame Jean Rivett-Drake, 1961–1964
- Brigadier Dame Joan Henderson, 1964– 25 August 1967
- Brigadier Dame Mary Anderson, 1967–1970
- Brigadier Sheila Heaney, 1970–1973
- Brigadier Eileen Nolan, 1973–1977
- Brigadier Anne Field, 1977–1982
- Brigadier Helen Meechie, 1982–1986
- Brigadier Shirley Nield, 1986–1989
- Brigadier Gael Ramsey, 1989–1992
- Brigadier Joan Roulstone, 1992–1994 (as Director Women (Army) during transitional period)

== The Staff Band of the WRAC ==
The Staff Band of the Women's Royal Army Corps was an all female military band. It was formed in 1949, and was the only all-female band in the British Armed Forces by the time it was disestablished. The Central Band of the Women's Royal Air Force, which was one of only two all-female bands to exist, transferred some of its musicians to the Band of the AGC after it was disbanded in 1972. Since the mid-1990s, women have served in all British Army bands. The instruments, assets and personnel of the former WRAC Band became the new Band of the Adjutant General's Corps.

== Reunion meetings ==
The WRAC organizes Reunion Meetings to promote solidarity among its former members.

== See also ==
- Women's Royal Air Force
- Women's Royal Naval Service
