= Leslie Whateley =

Dame Leslie Whateley
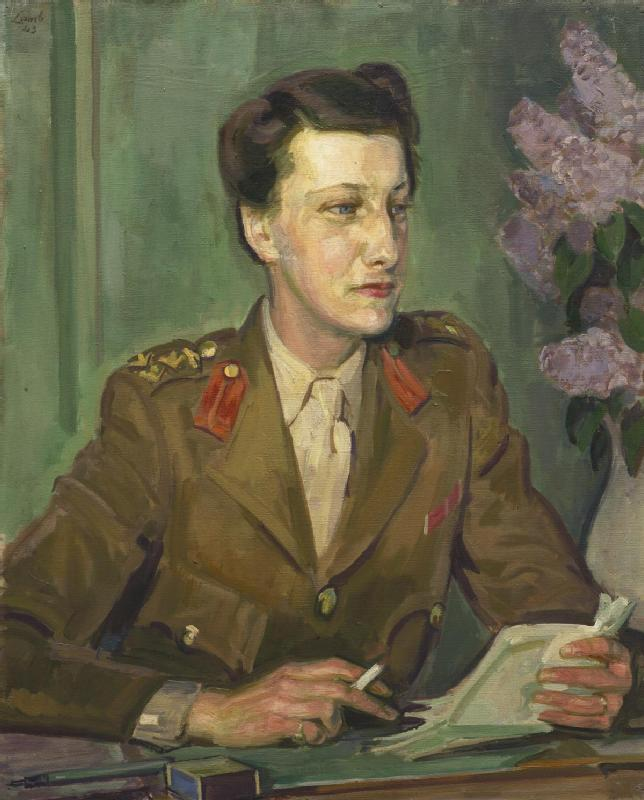
- Chief Controller Leslie Violet Lucy Whateley (1943) by Henry Lamb
- Born: 28 January 1899
- Died: 4 July 1987 (aged 88)
- Relatives: Field Marshal Sir Evelyn Wood (grandfather)
- Military career
- Allegiance: United Kingdom
- Branch: Auxiliary Territorial Service
- Commands: Auxiliary Territorial Service (1943–46)
- Conflicts: Second World War
- Awards: Dame Commander of the Order of the British Empire; Territorial Decoration

Dame Leslie Violet Lucy Evelyn Whateley, DBE, TD (née Wood; first married name Balfour; 28 January 1899 – 4 July 1987) was a Director of the Auxiliary Territorial Service (ATS) during the Second World War.

== Early life ==
She was born on 28 January 1899, the daughter of Colonel Evelyn FitzGerald Michell Wood and Lilian (née Hutton). She was the granddaughter of Field Marshal Sir Evelyn Wood.

== Career ==
Whateley joined the Auxiliary Territorial Service (ATS) in 1938 and became a junior officer following training at Chelsea Barracks. She served as Deputy Director of the ATS from September 1941. She was Director of the World Association of Girl Guides and Girl Scouts from 1951 to 1964.

In 1948, her writings were published by Hutchinson Publishing in Melbourne entitled As thoughts survive, a monograph with a preface by the then-Princess Royal.

== Marriages ==
She married, firstly, to William John Balfour, on 8 July 1922. The union ended in divorce in 1939. She married, secondly, to Squadron Leader Harry Raymond Whateley on 21 September 1939. Both unions were childless.

== Honours ==
- 1951: Territorial Decoration (TD) for long service in the reserves.
- 1963: Silver Fish Award, the highest adult award of the Girl Guide movement
- 1965: Bronze Wolf, the only distinction of the World Organization of the Scout Movement, awarded by the World Scout Committee for exceptional services to world Scouting

Military offices
Preceded by Jean Knox	Director, Auxiliary Territorial Service; 1943–1946	Succeeded by Dame Mary Tyrwhitt
