= Mary Coulshed =

Dame Mary Frances Coulshed
- Born: 10 November 1904; Sheffield, Yorkshire, England
- Died: 28 September 1998 (aged 93); Hendon, London, England
- Military career
- Allegiance: (United Kingdom) British
- Branch: British Army
- Rank: Brigadier
- Nickname: Mary Coulshed
- Commands: Women's Royal Army Corps
- Awards: Dame Commander of the Order of the British Empire; Territorial Decoration

Brigadier Dame Mary Frances Coulshed, DBE, TD (10 November 1904 – 28 September 1998) was a British Army officer who served as Director of the Women's Royal Army Corps (WRAC).

She was appointed Dame Commander of the Order of the British Empire (DBE) for her services to the British Army and the WRAC in the 1953 Coronation Honours.

She died unmarried on 28 September 1998, aged 93.
