= Tyrwhitt baronets =

Set index for Tyrwhitt baronets

There have been three baronetcies created for persons with the surname Tyrwhitt (pronounced "Tirrit"), one in the Baronetage of England and two in the Baronetage of the United Kingdom.

- Tyrwhitt baronets of Stainfield (1611)
- Tyrwhitt (Tyrwhitt Jones) baronets, of Stanley Hall (1808): see Baron Berners
- Tyrwhitt baronets of Terschelling and Oxford (1919)
