= Auxiliary Territorial Service =

Women's branch of the British Army

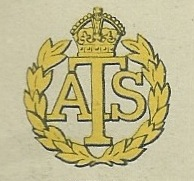
- Cap Badge of the Auxiliary Territorial Service
- Active: 9 September 1938 – 1 February 1949
- Allegiance: United Kingdom
- Branch: British Army
- Size: 190,000

Commanders
- Ceremonial chief: Princess Mary (Honorary Controller-Commandant)

The Auxiliary Territorial Service (ATS; often pronounced as an acronym) was the women's branch of the British Army during the Second World War. It was formed on 9 September 1938, initially as a women's voluntary service, and existed until 1 February 1949, when it was merged into the Women's Royal Army Corps.

The ATS had its roots in the Women's Auxiliary Army Corps (WAAC), which was formed in 1917 as a voluntary service. During the First World War its members served in a number of jobs including clerks, cooks, telephonists and waitresses. The WAAC was disbanded after four years in 1921.

Prior to the Second World War, the government decided to establish a new Corps for women, and an advisory council, which included members of the Territorial Army (TA), a section of the Women's Transport Service (FANY) and the Women's Legion, was set up. The council decided that the ATS would be attached to the Territorial Army, and the women serving would receive two thirds the pay of male soldiers.

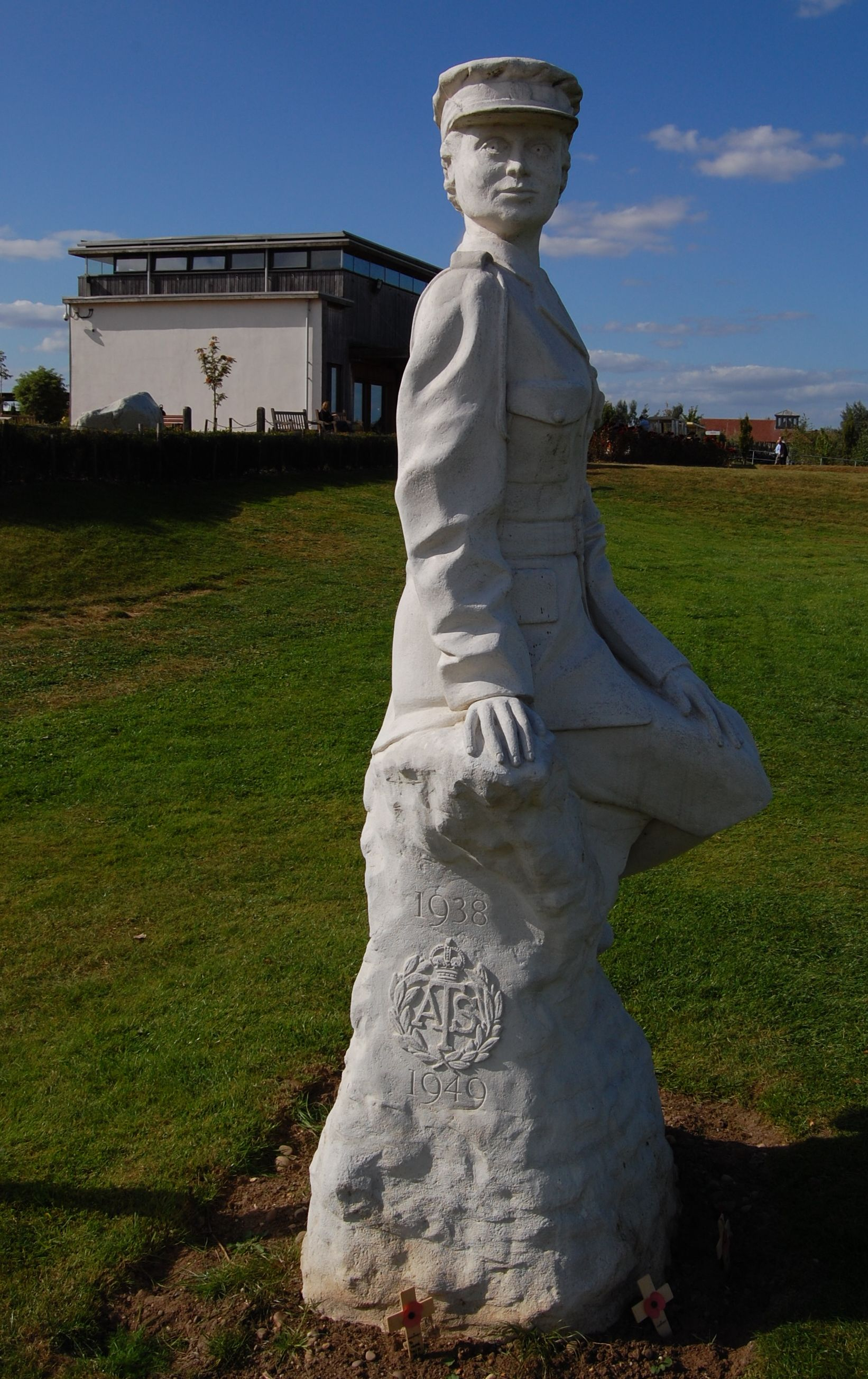
An ATS memorial at the National Memorial Arboretum

All women in the army joined the ATS except for nurses, who joined Queen Alexandra's Imperial Military Nursing Service (QAIMNS), medical and dental officers, who were commissioned directly into the Army and held army ranks, and those remaining in the FANY, known as Free FANYs.

== In action ==
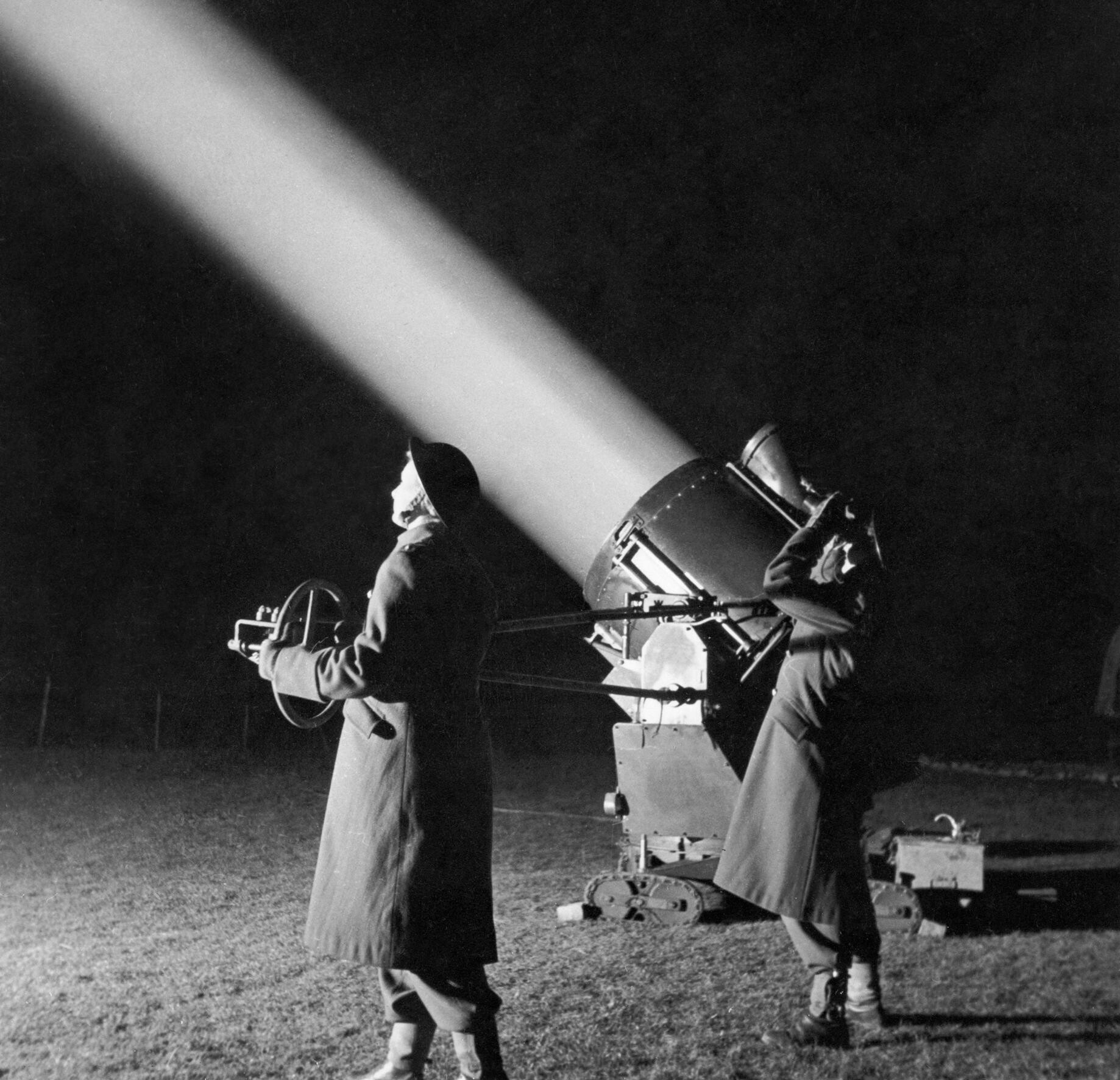
Two members of an ATS searchlight unit

The first recruits to the ATS were employed as cooks, clerks and storekeepers. At the outbreak of the Second World War, 300 ATS members were billeted to France. As the German Army advanced through France, the British Expeditionary Force was driven back towards the English Channel. This led to the evacuation of troops from Dunkirk in May 1940, and some ATS telephonists were among the last British personnel to leave the country.

As more men joined the war effort, it was decided to increase the size of the ATS, with numbers reaching 65,000 by September 1941. Women between the ages of 17 and 43 were allowed to join, although these rules were relaxed in order to allow WAAC veterans to join up to the age of 50. The duties of members were also expanded, seeing ATS orderlies, drivers, postal workers and ammunition inspectors.

Over the six-year period of the War, about 500 ATS personnel were trained to operate the Cinetheodolite, with the highest number being in 1943–44, when 305 ATS were in active service using this equipment.

One application of this specialist camera was in gunnery practice, where a pair of Cinetheodolites a known distance apart filmed the shell bursts from anti-aircraft artillery against target drones towed by an aircraft. By comparing the filmed location of the shells' detonation and the target, accurate calculations of their relative position could be made that would reveal any systematic error in the gunsights.

== The National Service Act ==
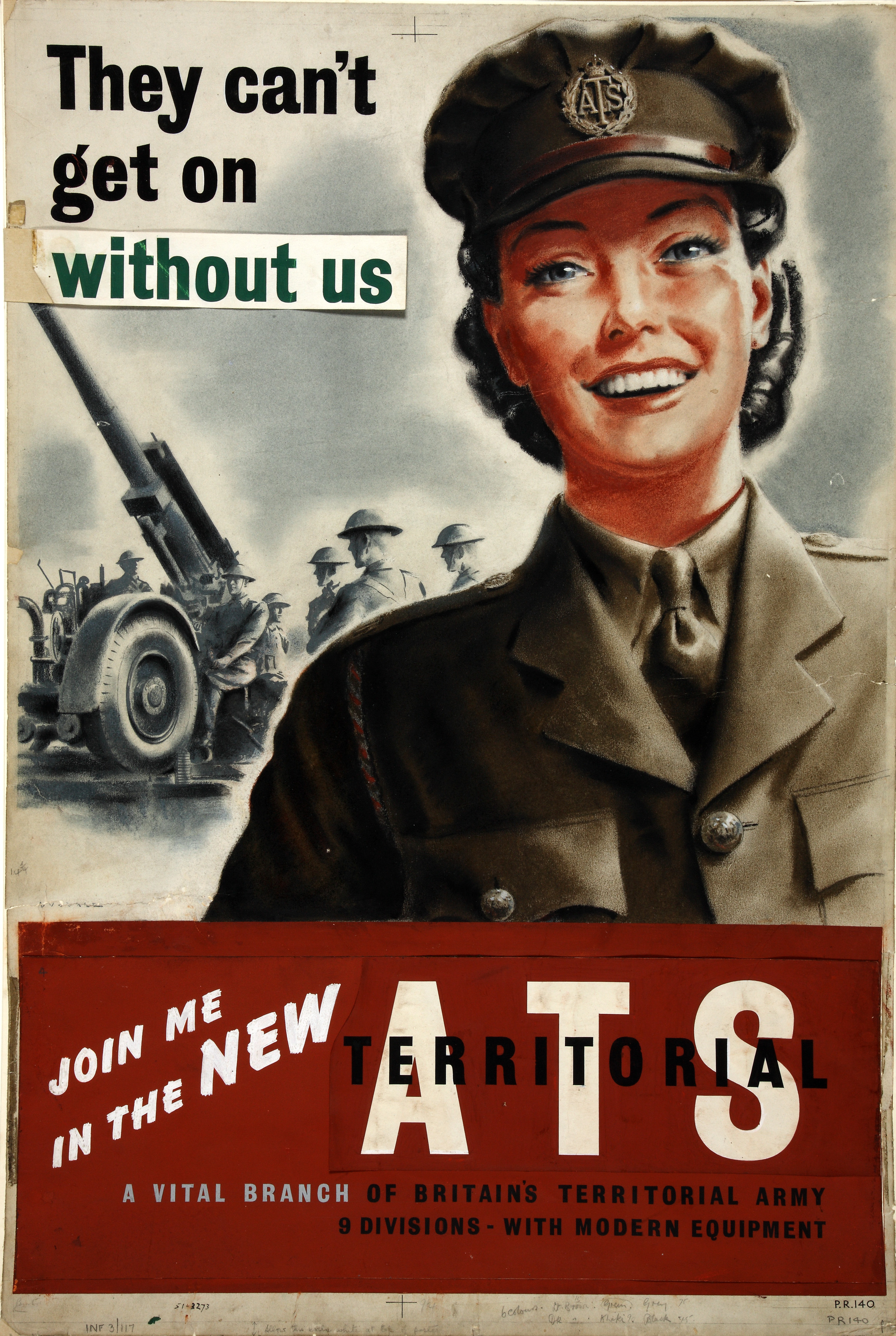
ATS recruitment poster, with AA gun in background

In December 1941, Parliament passed the National Service Act, which called up unmarried women between 20 and 30 years old to join one of the auxiliary services. These were the ATS, the Women's Royal Naval Service (WRNS), the Women's Auxiliary Air Force (WAAF) and the Women's Transport Service. Married women were also later called up, although pregnant women and those with young children were exempt. Other options under the Act included joining the Women's Voluntary Service (WVS), which supplemented the emergency services at home, or the Women's Land Army, helping on farms.

There was also provision made in the act for objection to service on moral grounds, as about a third of those on the conscientious objectors list were women. A number of women were prosecuted as a result of the act, some even being imprisoned. Despite this, by 1943 about nine out of ten women were taking an active part in the war effort.

Women were barred from serving in battle, but due to shortages of men, ATS members, as well as members of the other women's voluntary services, took over many support tasks, such as radar operators, forming part of the crews of anti-aircraft guns and military police. However, these roles were not without risk, and there were, according to the Imperial War Museum, 717 casualties during World War II. The first woman to be killed in action on service with the ATS was Private Nora Caveney. She died while operating a predictor on an anti-aircraft site near Weston Shore, Southampton.

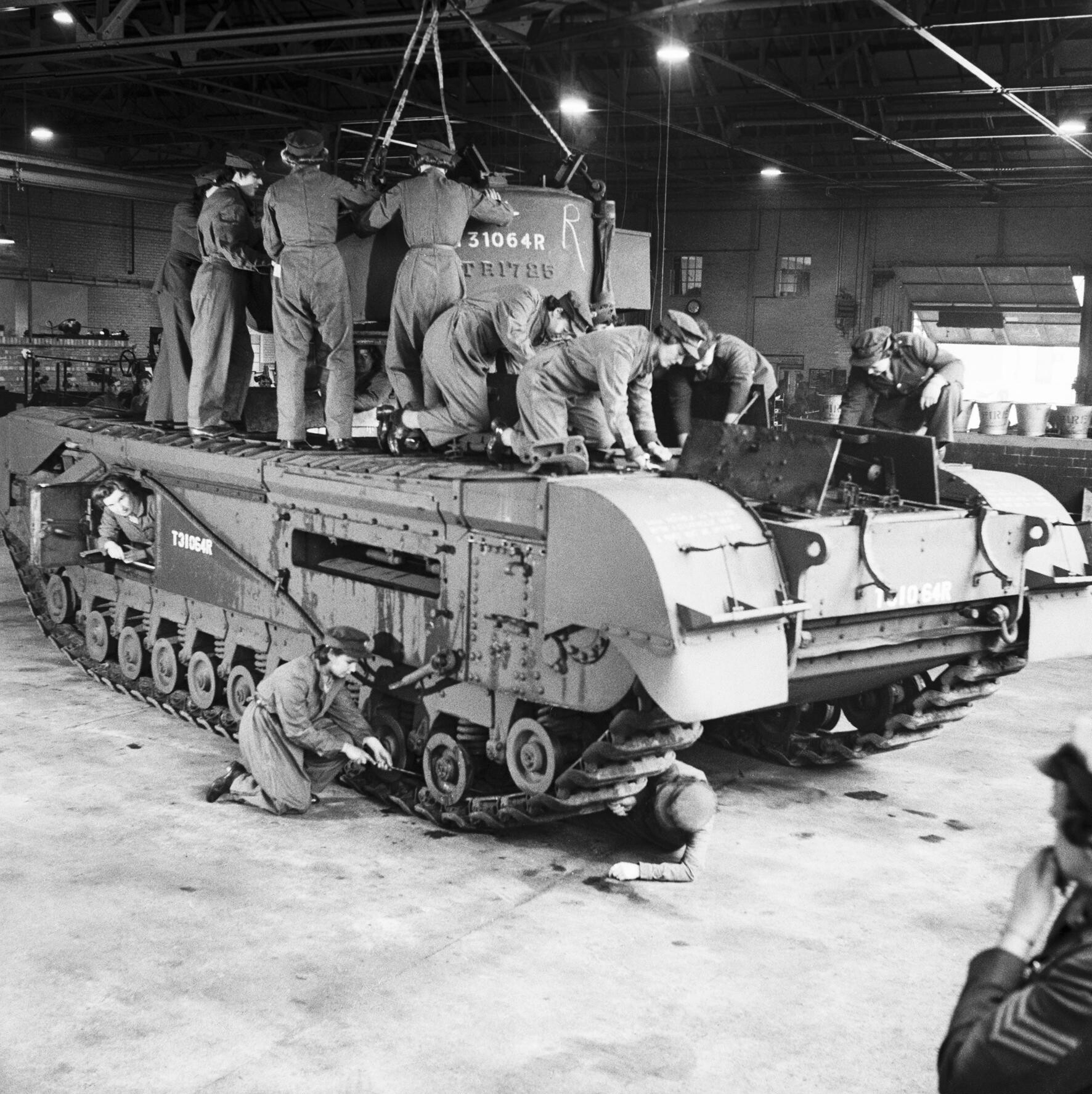
ATS women working on a Churchill tank at a Royal Army Ordnance Corps depot, 10 October 1942

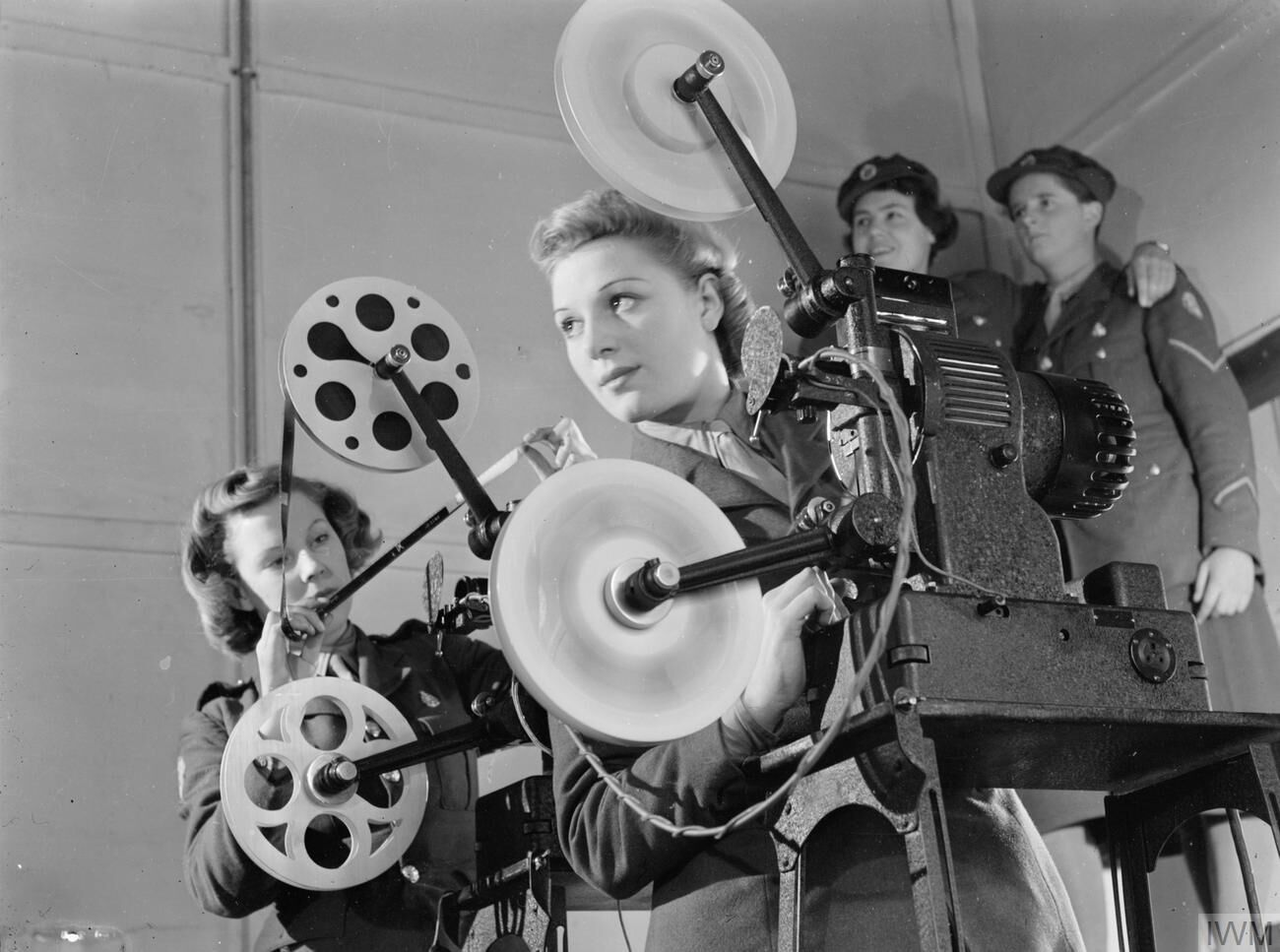
Two projectionists of the Auxiliary Territorial Service operate a projector at the field stores, Aldershot, in 1941.

The first 'Mixed' Heavy Anti-Aircraft (HAA) battery of the Royal Artillery (435 (Mixed) HAA Battery) was formed on 25 June 1941, and took over an operational gun site in Richmond Park, south-west London, in August. It was the forerunner of hundreds of similar units with the ATS supplying two-thirds of the personnel: at its height in 1943 three-quarters of Anti-Aircraft Command's HAA batteries were mixed. Several Heavy Anti-Aircraft regiments deployed to North West Europe with 21st Army Group in 1944–45 were 'Mixed' regiments.

A secret trial (the 'Newark Experiment' in April 1941) having shown that women were capable of operating heavy searchlight equipment and coping with conditions on the often desolate searchlight sites, members of the ATS began training at Rhyl to replace male personnel in searchlight regiments. At first they were employed in searchlight Troop headquarters, but in July 1942 the 26th (London Electrical Engineers) Searchlight Regiment, Royal Artillery became the first 'Mixed' regiment, with seven Troops of ATS women posted to it, forming the whole of 301 Battery and half of 339 Battery. In October that year the all-women 301 Battery was transferred to the new 93rd (Mixed) Searchlight Regiment, the last searchlight regiment formed during World War II, which by August 1943 comprised about 1500 women out of an establishment of 1674. Many other searchlight and anti-aircraft regiments on Home Defence followed, freeing men aged under 30 of medical category A1 for transfer to the infantry.

Similarly, by 1943 the ATS represented 10 per cent of the Royal Corps of Signals, having taken over the major part of the signal office and operating duties in the War Office and Home Commands, and ATS companies were sent to work on the lines of communications of active overseas theatres.

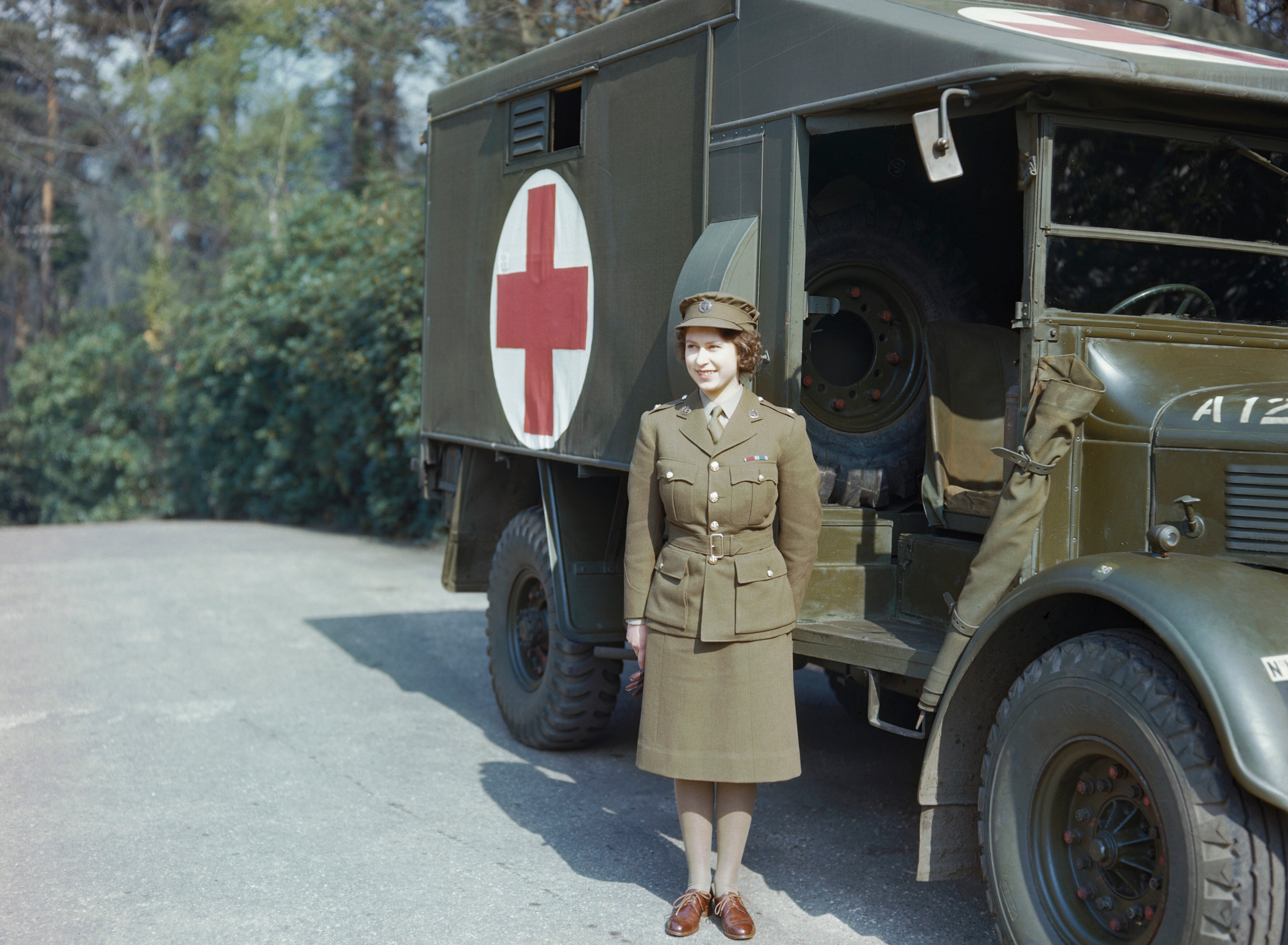
Princess Elizabeth in her ATS uniform in front of an army ambulance

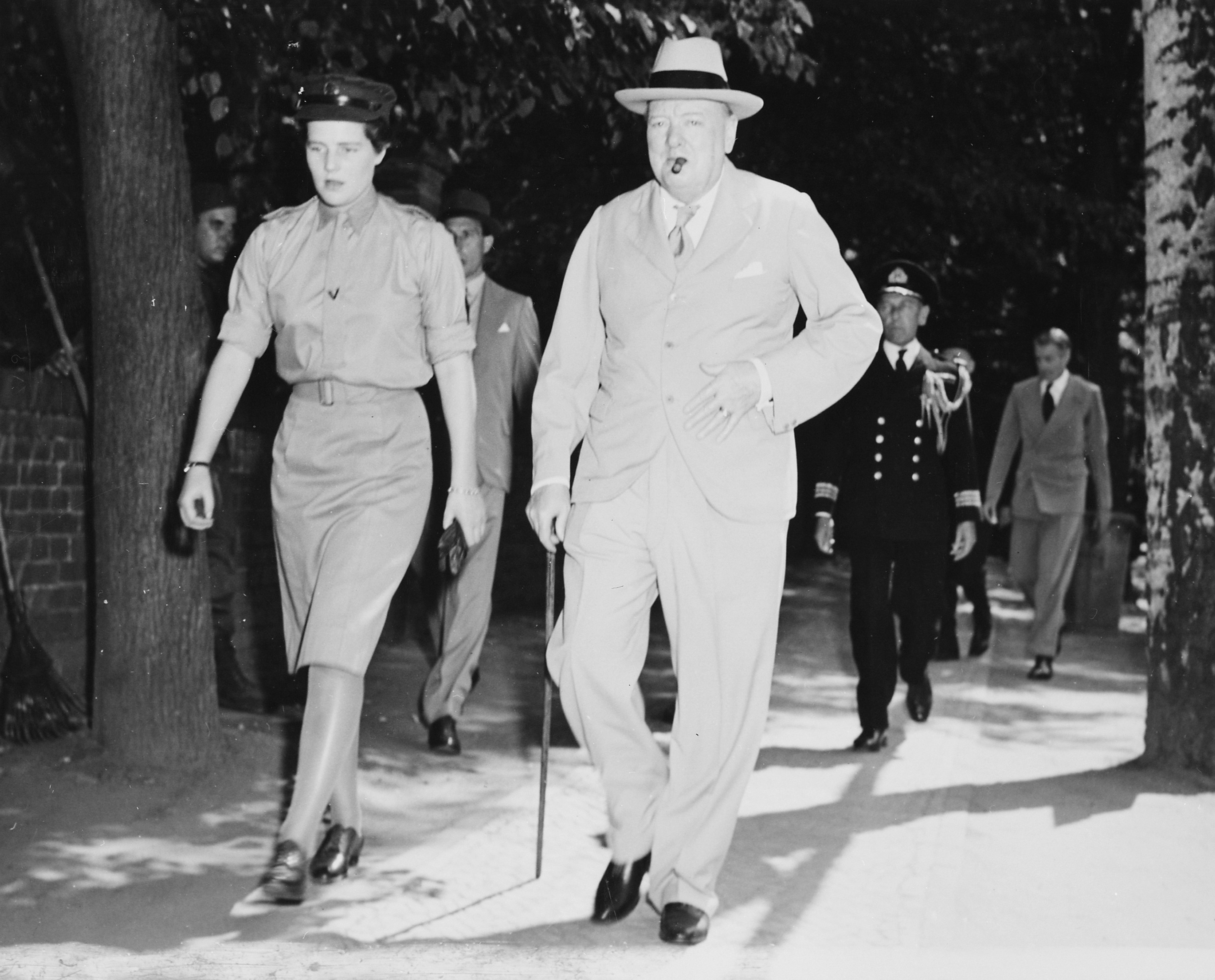
Mary Churchill, in her ATS uniform, accompanying her father Prime Minister Winston Churchill

By VE Day and before demobilization of the British armed forces, there were over 190,000 members of the women's Auxiliary Territorial Service.

Famous members of the ATS included Mary Churchill, youngest daughter of the prime minister, Winston Churchill, and Princess Elizabeth, later Queen Elizabeth II, eldest daughter of the King, who trained as a lorry driver, ambulance driver and mechanic. Nadia Cattouse was a Caribbean member of the Auxiliary Territorial Service.

== Volunteers from the Land of Israel ==
The Yishuv saw itself as part of the struggle against the Nazis, and the call for women to serve and enlist, just as many men had enlisted, was heard from the beginning of the war, despite opposition from religious groups.

In mid-1941, Zionist women's organizations, including representatives from WIZO, the Working Women's Council (today Na'amat), and Hadassah approached the British with a request to open the ATS to Jewish volunteers from what is called the Land of Israel. One of the central figures in this initiative was Hadassah Samuel, daughter-in-law of the High Commissioner Herbert Samuel. The Jewish Agency joined this appeal. In October 1941, the response was received that 5,000 women could be recruited, with 2,000 immediately. The Jewish Agency stipulated that the women would be enlisted into Hebrew organic units, a request that was only partially fulfilled. It was also stipulated that they would receive a special badge and that Hebrew would be used as a second official language among the recruits.

In December 1941, the official call for women to enlist was published, and in January 1942, the first group of 60 women was enlisted, intended to become officers and NCOs, and trained at Sarafand Camp. A Hebrew anthem was composed for the recruits.

After the initial recruitment cycles, it became clear that to achieve the goal of Hebrew women's companies, the recruitment pace needed to increase. In June 1942, the national institutions announced mandatory enlistment for all women aged 20 to 30 without children. Due to opposition from religious circles regarding women's enlistment, this order did not lead to full recruitment into the ATS ranks.

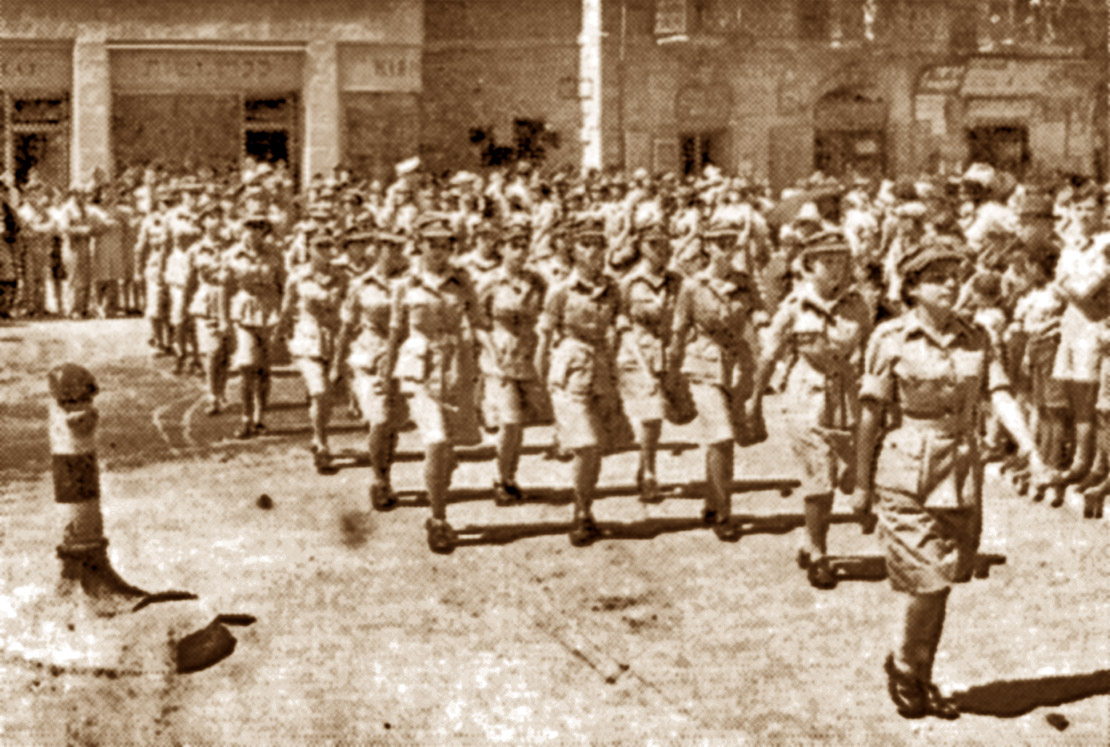
Women's Auxiliary Corps soldiers marching in Jerusalem, September 1943

Recruitment efforts included a truck campaign driven by ATS women who had completed a driving course in June 1942, and a large parade held in Jerusalem on September 9, 1943. To avoid provoking the Arabs, British censorship described the unit as including women from Poland, Czechoslovakia, and Germany, even though the vast majority of the women were Jewish immigrants to Mandatory Palestine.

Despite the desire to establish Hebrew ATS companies, only a few such companies were formed, and most women were dispersed among various ATS units in the Middle East.

In total, about 3,500 women from the Land of Israel served in the ATS during the war, in addition to 700 who served in the WAAF. Among the women were 50 officers, and one officer named Rachel Maklef-Mazor reached the rank of "Senior Commander," equivalent to the rank of Major in the Israel Defense Forces. The female soldiers served as drivers, nurses, clerks, and in ordnance roles. During the Second Battle of El Alamein, Jewish ATS drivers transported soldiers and ammunition to the front lines.

With the establishment of the Israel Defense Forces during the War of Independence, many ATS veterans integrated into its ranks in command roles. Among the ATS veterans who assumed command positions in the IDF were Hanna Levin, who served in the ATS as a service conditions officer with the rank of Lieutenant, became the IDF's Chief Recruitment Officer with the rank of Major, and after her discharge became mayor of Rishon LeZion; Esther Herlitz, who later became a Knesset member; and Stella Levy, who later became the IDF's Chief Women's Officer and a Knesset member.

== Post-war ==
After the cessation of hostilities women continued to serve in the ATS, as well as in the WRNS and WAAF. It was succeeded by the Women's Royal Army Corps (WRAC), which formed on 1 February 1949 under Army Order 6.

== Ranks ==
Initially ranks were completely different from those of the army, but used the same rank insignia, although the crown was replaced by a laurel wreath. Members were required to salute their own superior officers, but not other organisations' officers, although it was considered courteous to do so.

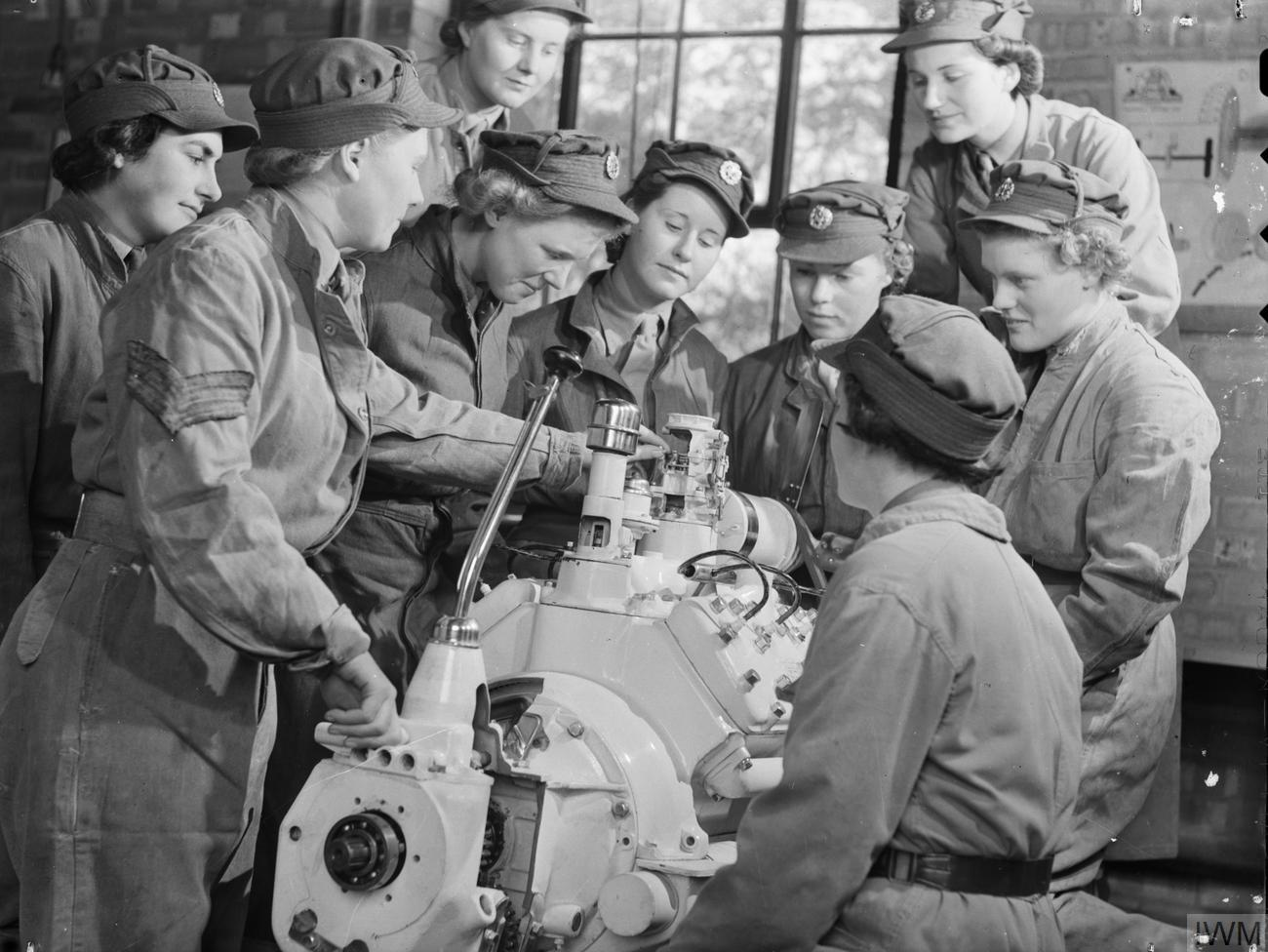
An instructor explains various parts of an engine to ATS trainees, 1941.

On 9 May 1941, the ATS rank structure was reorganised, and as of July 1941 the ATS was given full military status and members were no longer volunteers. The other ranks now held almost identical ranks to army personnel, but officers continued to have a separate rank system, that was somewhat modified. All uniforms and badges of rank remained the same, although crowns replaced laurel wreaths in the rank insignia. Members were now required to salute all superior officers.

The only holders of the rank of chief controller were the first three directors, promoted to the rank on their appointment, and Princess Mary, who held it from 1939 and was appointed the ATS's honorary controller-commandant in August 1941.

When other ranks were assigned to mixed-sex Royal Artillery batteries of Anti-Aircraft Command starting in 1941, they were accorded the Royal Artillery ranks of gunner, lance-bombardier, and bombardier (instead of private, lance-corporal, and corporal), and wore the RA's braided white lanyard on the right shoulder and the 'grenade' collar badge above the left breast pocket of their uniform tunic.

=== Officers ===
	General officers					Field officers			Junior officers
(United Kingdom) Auxiliary Territorial Service (1938–1941)
(United Kingdom) Auxiliary Territorial Service (1938–1941)				Chief controller	Senior controller	Controller	Chief commandant	Senior commandant	Company commander	Deputy company commander	Company assistant
(United Kingdom) Auxiliary Territorial Service (1941–1949)
(United Kingdom) Auxiliary Territorial Service (1941–1949)				Chief controller	Senior controller	Controller	Chief commander	Senior commander	Junior commander	Subaltern	Second subaltern
United Kingdom (1928–1953)
United Kingdom (1928–1953)	Field Marshal	General	Lieutenant-General	Major-General	Brigadier	Colonel	Lieutenant-Colonel	Major	Captain	Lieutenant	Second Lieutenant	Officer Cadet
NATO code	OF-10	OF-9	OF-8	OF-7	OF-6	OF-5	OF-4	OF-3	OF-2	OF-1

=== Other ranks ===
Rank group	Senior NCOs						Junior NCOs		Enlisted
(United Kingdom) Auxiliary Territorial Service (1938–1941)									No insignia
(United Kingdom) Auxiliary Territorial Service (1938–1941)		Senior Leader			Section Leader		Sub-Leader	Chief Volunteer	Volunteer
(United Kingdom) Auxiliary Territorial Service (1941–1949)									No insignia
(United Kingdom) Auxiliary Territorial Service (1941–1949)	Warrant Officer Class I	Warrant Officer Class II		Staff Sergeant	Sergeant		Corporal; Bombardier (Note: used when assigned to AAC batteries)	Lance Corporal; Lance Bombardier (Note: used when assigned to AAC batteries)	Private; Gunner (Note: used when assigned to AAC batteries)
United Kingdom (1920 – 1953)						No equivalent			No insignia
United Kingdom (1920 – 1953)	Warrant Officer Class I	Warrant Officer Class II	Warrant Officer Class III (Note: 1938–1940)	Staff/Colour Sergeant	Sergeant	No equivalent	Corporal	Lance Corporal	Private (or equivalent)
NATO code	OR-9	OR-8		OR-7	OR-6	OR-5	OR-4	OR-3	OR-2	OR-1

== List of Directors ==
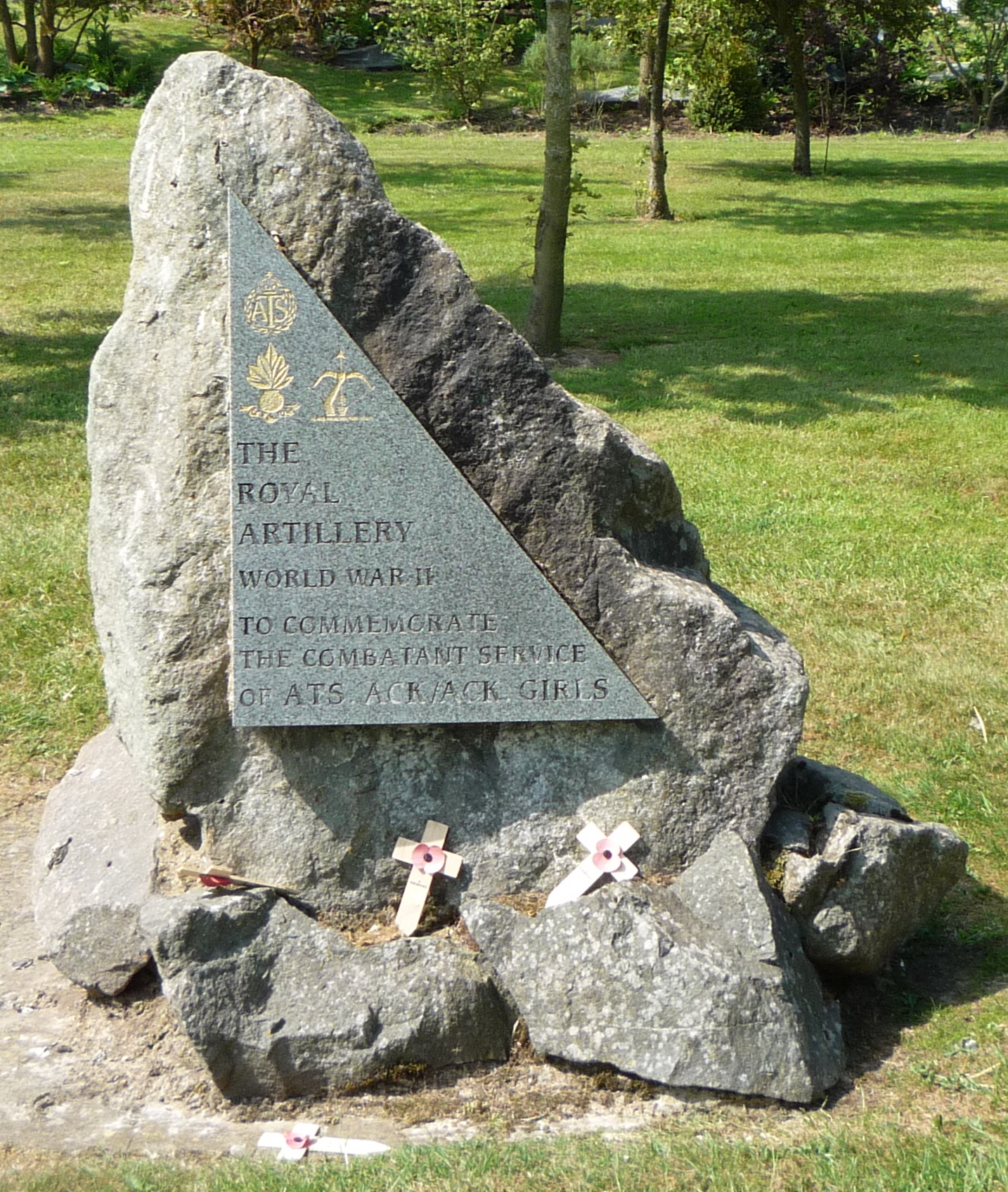
ATS 'Ack-Ack Girls' memorial at the National Memorial Arboretum. The badges depicted are those of the ATS, Royal Artillery and Anti-Aircraft Command.

- Chief Controller Dame Helen Gwynne-Vaughan, July 1939 – July 1941
- Chief Controller Jean Knox, July 1941 – October 1943
- Chief Controller Dame Leslie Whateley, October 1943 – April 1946
- Senior Controller Dame Mary Tyrwhitt, April 1946 – January 1949

== Notable personnel ==
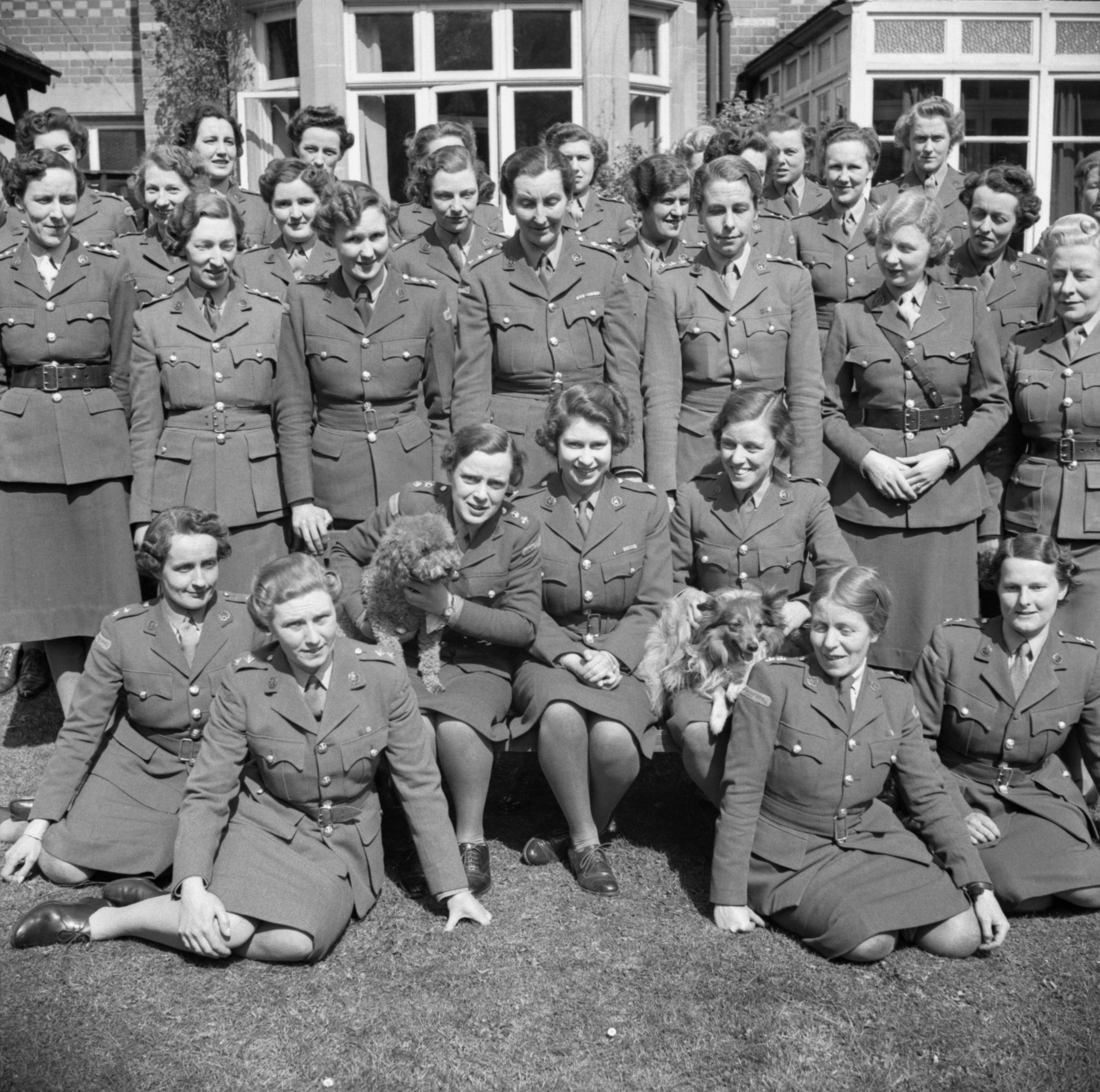
Princess Elizabeth (centre) with officers of the ATS Training Centre

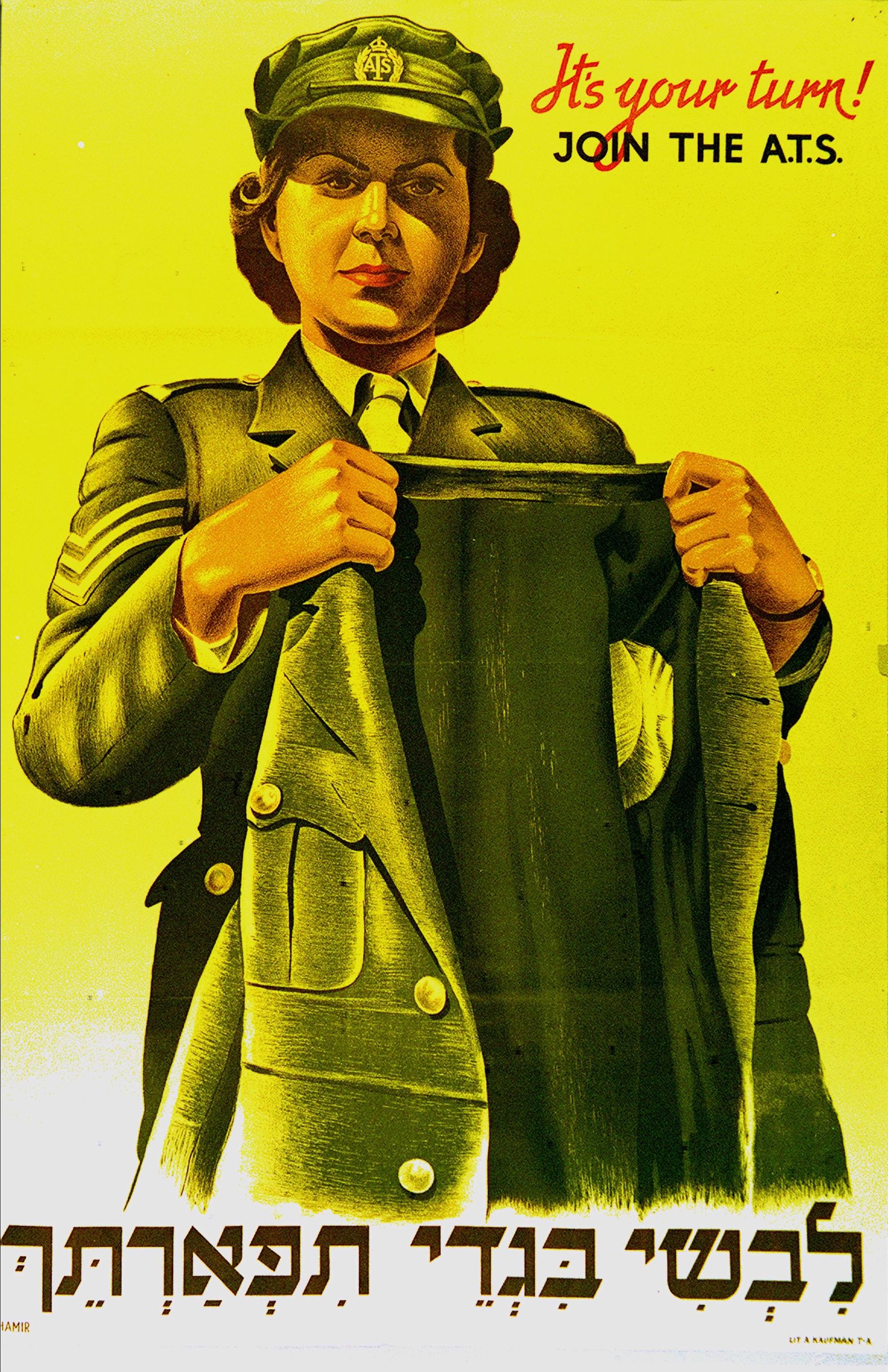
ATS recruitment poster from Mandatory Palestine, in English and Hebrew

- Julian Phelps Allan
- Betty Harvie Anderson, Baroness Skrimshire of Quarter
- Henrietta Barnett, later Director of the WRAF
- Violet Bathurst, Lady Apsley
- Joan Bernard
- Bridget Boland
- Nadia Cattouse
- Audrey Chitty
- Mary Spencer-Churchill (later Baroness Soames)
- Mary Colvin
- Ena Collymore-Woodstock
- Primrose Cumming
- Princess Elizabeth (later Queen Elizabeth II)
- Margaret Fairchild
- Pamela Frankau
- Christian Fraser-Tytler
- Edith Gell
- Gay Gibson
- Valerie Goulding
- Susan Hibbert
- Elisabeth Kirkby
- Esme Langley
- Margot Marshall
- Linda McCullough Thew
- Bridget Monckton, 11th Lady Ruthven of Freeland
- Stella Moray
- Maisie Mosco
- Jennifer Moyle
- Eileen Nolan
- Julia Pirie
- Elisabeth Rivers-Bulkeley
- Yvonne Rudelatt
- Stella Schmolle
- Nancy Salmon
- Betty Webb
- Leslie Whateley
- Estelle White
- Celia Whitelaw, Viscountess Whitelaw

== In popular culture ==
The 1943 film The Gentle Sex is a dramatised documentary depicting the experiences of seven ATS recruits. Directed by Leslie Howard, the film was described as a "morale booster and as a recruitment advertisement" for the service.

== See also ==
- Air Transport Auxiliary
- National Association of Training Corps for Girls
- Women's Auxiliary Air Force
- Women's Royal Naval Service
