= Nigel Guild =

Royal Navy Rear Admiral (born 1949)

Rear Admiral Nigel Guild CB FREng
- Born: 9 February 1949 (age 77); Simonstown, South Africa
- Military career
- Allegiance: United Kingdom
- Branch: Royal Navy
- Service years: 1966-2009
- Rank: Rear Admiral
- Awards: Companion of the Order of the Bath

Rear-Admiral Nigel Charles Forbes Guild CB FREng (born 9 February 1949) is a former Royal Navy officer who went on to be Controller of the Navy.

== Naval career ==
Educated at Bryanston School, Trinity College, Cambridge and the Royal Naval College, Dartmouth, Guild joined the Royal Navy in 1966. Promoted to captain in 1990, he was appointed Military Assistant to the Chief of Defence Procurement. In 1996 he became Director of Combat Systems and Equipment at the Procurement Executive and in 1998 he took charge of the implementation of the "smart" procurement system. Promoted to rear admiral in 2000, he was made Controller of the Navy as well as an executive director of the Defence Procurement Agency and then, from 2004, he became Senior Responsible Owner (Carrier Strike Capability) as well as Chief Naval Engineer Officer. He retired from the Navy in 2009.

He is President of the Institute of Marine Engineering, Science and Technology.

== Family ==
In 1971 he married Felicity.

Military offices
Preceded by Sir Peter Spencer	Controller of the Navy; 2000–2003	Succeeded by Richard Cheadle
