= Controller of the Navy (Royal Navy) =

British naval officer

Controller of the Navy (CofN)
- Ensign of the Royal Navy
- Incumbent; Rear Admiral Richard Harris since 9 September 2025
- Department of the Admiralty, Ministry of Defence
- Member of: Board of Admiralty, Admiralty Board, Navy Board
- Reports to: First Sea Lord
- Nominator: First Lord of the Admiralty, Secretary of State for Defence
- Appointer: Prime Minister; Subject to formal approval by the King-in-Council
- Term length: Not fixed (typically 1–3 years)
- Inaugural holder: Rear Admiral Sir Samuel Pechell
- Formation: 1832-current

The post of Controller of the Navy (abbreviated as CofN) was originally created in 1859 when the Surveyor of the Navy's title changed to Controller of the Navy. In 1869 the controller's office was abolished and its duties were assumed by that of the Third Naval Lord whose title then changed to Third Naval Lord and Controller of the Navy. In 1904 the title was changed again to Third Sea Lord and Controller of the Navy. In 1965, the words Third Sea Lord were removed, and the title became simply Controller of the Navy. The post-holder is responsible for procurement and matériel in the British Royal Navy.

Originally the post-holder was a member of the Board of Admiralty and later a member of the Admiralty Board.

== History ==
The original office of Comptroller of the Navy was established in 1561 during the reign of Elizabeth I of England which was a very different function from what became known later as the Controller of the Navy. They presided over the Navy Board from 1660, and generally superintended the business of the Navy Office, they were responsible for all naval spending and for the offices dealing with bills, accounts and wages during the sixteenth and seventeenth centuries. By the eighteenth century the principal officer responsible for estimating annual stores requirements, inspecting ships' stores and maintaining the Fleet's store-books and repair-bills was the Surveyor of the Navy however their duties passed increasingly to the Comptroller of the Navy during the latter half of this period. The office of the Surveyor did not altogether disappear. In 1805 for the first time, specific functions were assigned to each of the 'Naval' Lords, who were described as 'Professional' Lords, leaving to the civil lords to the routine business of signing off all official documents. In 1832 the original office of the Comptroller was abolished following a merger with the Board of Admiralty and the Surveyor was made the officer responsible under the First Sea Lord for the material departments. In 1859 the office of Surveyor of the Navy who had overall responsibility for ship design was renamed and the post became known as the Controller of the Navy.

In the re-organisation of the Admiralty by Order in Council of 14 January 1869, the Controller of the Navy was given a seat on the Board of Admiralty as the Third Lord and Controller of the Navy. They also inherited the new duties of the Storekeeper-General of the Navy, whose post was abolished. The Controller lost the title of Third Lord and the seat on the board by an Order in Council of 19 March 1872, but regained them by a further Order in Council of 10 March 1882. In 1872 they again became subordinate to the First Sea Lord, but had the right to attend board meetings when the business of the department was under discussion. In 1882 the Controller again became independent of the First Sea Lord and became a board member again as Third Naval Lord and Controller. The Third Naval Lord's post was renamed to become known as the Third Sea Lord and Controller in 1904. The appointment of Controller of the Navy was abolished in September 1912, although that of Third Sea Lord remained. Thereafter, except for a period in 1917 to 1918 when there was a civilian Controller, the titles of Third Sea Lord and Controller of the Navy went together.

The Third Sea Lord and Controller was mainly responsible for superintending the work of the Royal Naval Scientific Service and for a number of Admiralty departments, including those of the Department of the Director of Naval Construction, (from 1958 the Department of the Director General Ships), of the Department of the Engineer in Chief (formerly the Steam Department), of the Department of the Director of Naval Ordnance, of the Department of the Director of Dockyards and, following a board decision in 1911, of the Admiralty Compass Observatory, formerly under the control of the Hydrographer's Department. In wartime they also had responsibility for the supply of equipment to Combined Operations Headquarters. From 1958 the Fourth Sea Lord was also known as Vice Controller of the Navy they assumed the superintendence of the naval dockyard organisation and the maintenance of the fleet. In 1965 the appointment of Third Sea Lord was abolished and the individual responsible for the materiel side of the navy became simply Controller of the Navy. From 2003 until April 2013 the post holder jointly held different titles such as Director, Land Maritime, 2003–2006, Director-General, Nuclear, 2006–2009, Capability Manager/Director (Precision Attack), 2009-2012 and Director, Maritime Capability and Transformation, 2012–2013. From April 2013 until November 2018 the post holder simultaneously held the titles of Assistant Chief of the Naval Staff (Capability) and Chief of Staff Navy Command (HQ) post holders include: From November 2018, the post holder has been just Assistant Chief of the Naval Staff (Capability). ACNS Capability is also known as Director Develop as of September 2020.

== List of office holders ==
=== Third Naval Lords 1832–1868 ===
- Rear Admiral Sir Samuel Pechell 1832–1834
- Rear Admiral Sir Charles Rowley 1834–1835
- Rear Admiral Sir George Elliot 1835–1837
- Rear Admiral Sir Sir Edward Troubridge, 2nd Baronet 1837–1841
- Rear Admiral Sir Samuel Pechell 1841
- Rear Admiral Sir George Seymour 1841–1844
- Rear Admiral Sir William Bowles 1844–1846
- Rear Admiral Sir Maurice Berkeley 1846–1847
- Rear Admiral Lord John Hay 1847–1850
- Rear Admiral Sir Houston Stewart 1850–1852
- Rear Admiral Sir James Stirling 1852
- Rear Admiral Sir Thomas Herbert 1852–1853
- Rear Admiral Sir Richard Dundas 1853–1854
- Rear Admiral Sir Peter Richards 1854–1857
- Rear Admiral Henry Eden 1857
- Rear Admiral Sir Alexander Milne 1857–1859
- Rear Admiral Sir Henry Leeke 1859
- Rear Admiral Sir Charles Eden 1859–1861
- Rear Admiral Charles Frederick 1861–1865
- Rear Admiral Sir Edward Fanshawe 1865–1866
- Rear Admiral Henry Seymour 1866–1868

=== Third Lords and Controllers of the Navy 1869–1872 ===
- Admiral Sir Robert Robinson, 1869–1871
- Captain Robert Hall, 1871–1872

=== Controllers of the Navy 1872–1882 ===
- Captain Robert Hall, 1872
- Admiral Sir William Stewart, 1872–1881
- Rear-Admiral Thomas Brandreth, 1881–1882

=== Third Naval Lords and Controllers of the Navy 1882–1904 ===
Third Naval Lords and Controllers of the Navy include:

- Vice-Admiral Thomas Brandreth, 1882–1886
- Vice-Admiral Sir William Graham, 1886–1888
- Vice-Admiral John Hopkins, 1888–1892
- Vice-Admiral Sir John Fisher, 1892–1897
- Rear-Admiral Arthur Wilson, 1897–1901
- Rear-Admiral William May, 1901–1905

=== Third Sea Lord and Controllers of the Navy 1904–1912 ===
- Rear-Admiral Sir Henry Jackson, 1905–1908
- Rear-Admiral Sir John Jellicoe, 1908–1909
- Rear-Admiral Reginald Bacon, 1909
- Rear-Admiral Charles Briggs, 1910–1912
- Rear-Admiral Gordon Moore, 1912

=== Third Sea Lords 1912–1918 ===
- Rear-Admiral Gordon Moore, 1912–1914
- Rear-Admiral Frederick Tudor, 1914–1917
- Rear-Admiral Lionel Halsey, 1917–1918

=== Third Sea Lords and Controllers of the Navy 1918–1965 ===
Third Sea Lords and Controllers of the Navy include:

- Rear-Admiral Sir Charles de Bartolomé, 1918–1919
- Rear-Admiral Sir William Nicholson, 1919–1920
- Rear-Admiral Sir Frederick Field, 1920–1923
- Rear-Admiral Cyril Fuller, 1923–1925
- Vice-Admiral Sir Ernle Chatfield, 1925–1928
- Vice-Admiral Roger Backhouse, 1928–1932
- Vice-Admiral Charles Forbes, 1932–1934
- Admiral Sir Reginald Henderson, 1934–1939
- Vice-Admiral Sir Bruce Fraser, 1939–1942
- Admiral Sir Frederic Wake-Walker, 1942–1945
- Vice-Admiral Sir Charles Daniel, 1945–1949
- Admiral Sir Michael Denny, 1949–1953
- Admiral Sir Ralph Edwards, 1953–1956
- Admiral Sir Peter Reid, 1956–1961
- Admiral Sir Michael Le Fanu, 1961–1965

=== Controllers of the Navy 1965–current ===
Post holders include:

- Admiral Sir Horace Law, 1965–1970
- Admiral Sir Michael Pollock, 1970–1971
- Admiral Sir Anthony Griffin, 1971–1975
- Admiral Sir Richard Clayton, 1975–1979
- Admiral Sir John Fieldhouse, 1979–1981
- Admiral Sir Lindsay Bryson, 1981–1984
- Admiral Sir Derek Reffell, 1984–1989
- Admiral Sir Kenneth Eaton, 1989–1994
- Vice-Admiral Sir Robert Walmsley, 1994–1996
- Rear-Admiral Frederick Scourse, 1996–1997
- Rear-Admiral Peter Spencer, 1997–2000
- Rear-Admiral Nigel Guild, 2000–2003
- Rear-Admiral Richard Cheadle, 2003–2006 (also Director, Land Maritime)
- Rear-Admiral Andrew Mathews, 2006–2007 (also Director-General, Nuclear)
- Rear-Admiral Paul Lambert, 2007–2009 (ditto)
- Rear-Admiral Amjad Hussain, 2009–2012 (also Capability Manager/Director (Precision Attack))
- Rear-Admiral Henry Parker, 2012–2013 (also Director, Maritime Capability and Transformation)
- Rear-Admiral Duncan Potts, April 2013 – September 2014
- Rear-Admiral James Morse, September 2014 – May 2016
- Rear-Admiral Paul Bennett, May 2016 – November 2017
- Major-General Robert Magowan, RM. November 2017 – November 2018
- Rear-Admiral Hugh Beard, November 2018 – January 2020
- Rear-Admiral Andrew Burns, January 2020 – September 2021
- Rear-Admiral James Parkin, September 2021 – 2025 (retired in 2025)
- Rear-Admiral Richard Harris, September 2025 – present

== Departments under the office ==
At various times included:

=== Current ===
- Office of the Assistant Chief of Staff Warfare
- Office of the Assistant Chief of Staff Information Superiority
- Office of the Assistant Chief of Staff Maritime Capability
- Office Assistant Chief of Staff Integrated Change Programme

=== Former ===
At various times included:

- Admiralty Compass Observatory, formerly under the control of the Hydrographer of the Navy's department
- Combined Operations Headquarters (supply of equipment only).
- Department of the Director of Dockyards, (1885–1954)
- Department of the Director of Naval Construction
  - Royal Corps of Naval Constructors
- Department of the Director General Ships
- Department of the Director Contract-built ships
- Department of the Director of Electrical Engineering
- Department of the Director of Naval Equipment
- Department of the Director of Scientific Research
- Department of the Engineer in Chief (formerly the Steam Department)
- Department of the Inspector of Dockyard Expense Accounts
- Department of the Director of Torpedoes and Mines
- Department of the Surveyor of Dockyards, (1872–1885)
- Directorate of Naval Construction, (1913–1958)
- Naval Ordnance Department
  - Department of the Assistant Director of Torpedoes
  - Naval Ordnance Stores Department (1918–1964)
- Naval Stores Department, (1869–1966)
- Dockyards and Fleet Maintenance Department, (1957–1964)
- Department of Dockyards and Maintenance, (1964–1968)
- Office of the Assistant Controller
- Office of the Assistant Controller Research and Development
- Office of the Controller, (1917–1918)
- Office of the Deputy Controller of Navy, (1939–1941)
- Office of the Deputy Controller Production
- Office of the Inspector Gun Mountings
- Office of the Superintendent of Stores, (1869–1917)
- Office of the Vice Controller of the Navy, (1939–1945)
- Office of the Vice Controller Air
  - Department of the Director of Naval Equipment
  - Armament Supply Department, (1891–1918)
    - Royal Naval Armaments Depot
  - Department of the Chief Inspector of Naval Ordnance, (1908–1922)
  - Naval Ordnance Inspection Department, (1922–1964)
- Royal Naval Scientific Service
- Steam Department

== See also ==
- First Sea Lord
- Second Sea Lord
- Fourth Sea Lord
- Fifth Sea Lord
- Comptroller of the Navy (1561–1832)
