= Admiral Richards =

Admiral Richards may refer to:

- Alan Richards (born 1958), British Royal Navy vice admiral
- Charles A. Richard (born 1959), U.S. Navy admiral
- Frederick Richards (1833–1912), British Royal Navy admiral
- Peter Richards (Royal Navy officer) (1787–1869), British Royal Navy admiral
- Thomas R. Richards (born 1947), U.S. Navy rear admiral
