= Clifford Cornford =

British civil servant and government scientist

Sir Edward Clifford Cornford, KCB (6 February 1918 – 6 May 1999) was a British civil servant and government scientist.

Educated at Kimbolton School and Jesus College, Cambridge, he entered the Royal Aircraft Establishment (RAE) in 1938 as a junior scientific officer. He was part of the Air Warfare Analysis Section from the outset of its existence and throughout the Second World War. He rejoined RAE in 1945 and worked on guided weaponry; he served as head of the assessments division from 1951 to 1956, and then head of the guided weapons department. He was chairman of the Defence Research Policy Staff (1961–65), before serving as Chief Scientist (Army) from 1965 to 1968, then Deputy Chief Adviser (Research and Studies) from 1968 to 1969. He was Controller, Guided Weapons and Electronics at the Ministry of Technology from 1969 to 1972, and then Controller (Policy) at the Ministry of Defence's Procurement Executive from 1972 to 1975. Cornford was then Chief Executive of the Procurement Executive from 1975 (renamed Chief of Defence Procurement in 1977). He retired in 1980. In retirement, he was a director of the Post Office from 1981 to 1987 and chairman of Raytheon Europe from 1982 to 1991.
