= Frederick Scourse =

Royal Navy Rear Admiral (born 1944)

Rear Admiral Frederick Scourse CB MBE FREng
- Born: 23 June 1944 (age 82)
- Military career
- Allegiance: United Kingdom
- Branch: Royal Navy
- Service years: 1962 – 1997
- Rank: Rear Admiral
- Awards: Companion of the Order of the Bath; Member of the Order of the British Empire; FREng

Rear Admiral Frederick Peter Scourse CB MBE FREng (born 23 June 1944) is a former Royal Navy officer who became Acting Controller of the Navy. He was appointed a Fellow of the Royal Academy of Engineering in 2000.

== Naval career ==
Scourse joined the Royal Navy in 1962 and chose to specialize in submarines. He was appointed assistant director for the Trident submarine programme and then Head of Reactor Safety before becoming Military Assistant to the Chief of Defence Procurement in 1987. He went on to be Director-General of Surface Weapons in 1988. In 1996 he was appointed Acting Controller of the Navy and Director-General of Surface Ships; he retired in 1997.

In retirement he became Nuclear Weapons Safety Advisor to the Ministry of Defence as well as a consultant to the Office of Government Commerce.

Military offices
Preceded by Sir Robert Walmsley	Controller of the Navy (Acting); 1996–1997	Succeeded by Sir Peter Spencer
