= Peter Spencer (Royal Navy officer) =

Vice Admiral Sir Peter Spencer KCB
- Born: 1947 (age 78–79); Brighton, Sussex
- Military career
- Allegiance: United Kingdom
- Branch: Royal Navy
- Service years: 1965–2003
- Rank: Vice admiral
- Commands: Second Sea Lord and Commander-in-Chief Naval Home Command
- Awards: Knight Commander of the Order of the Bath

Vice Admiral Sir Peter Spencer KCB (born 1947) is a Royal Navy officer who became Second Sea Lord.

== Naval career ==
Born in Brighton and educated at both Queens' College, Cambridge and Southampton University, Spencer was commissioned into the Royal Navy in 1965.

In 1992 he was appointed Director of Operational Requirements for the Royal Navy and in 1995 went on to be Director General Fleet Support for Operations and Plans. In 1997 he became Director General Surface Ships and Controller of the Navy.

In 2000 he became Second Sea Lord and Commander-in-Chief Naval Home Command and in 2003 he became Chief of Defence Procurement.

In retirement he became Chief Executive of Action for ME, a charity supporting people suffering from chronic fatigue syndrome.

== Family ==
He is married to Lisa and they have four children.

Military offices
Preceded by Frederick Scourse (Acting)	Controller of the Navy; 1997–2000	Succeeded by Nigel Guild
Preceded by Sir John Brigstocke	Second Sea Lord; 2000–2003	Succeeded by Sir James Burnell-Nugent
Preceded by Sir Robert Walmsley	Chief of Defence Procurement; 2003–2007	Succeeded by Sir Kevin O'Donoghue; As Chief of Defence Materiel
