= Hugh Beard =

Royal Navy Rear Admiral (born 1967)

Rear Admiral Hugh Beard CB
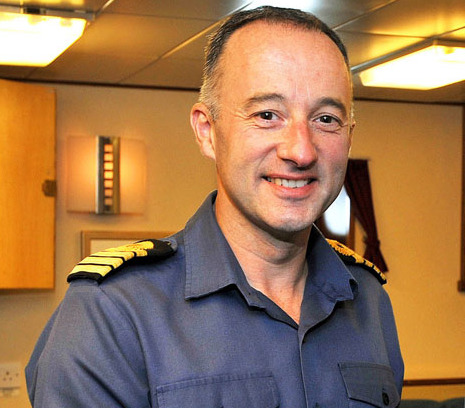
- Captain Beard in 2014
- Born: Hugh Dominic Beard; 28 December 1967 (age 58); Birmingham, England
- Spouse: Jennifer Beard
- Military career
- Allegiance: United Kingdom
- Branch: Royal Navy
- Service years: 1987–2023
- Rank: Rear Admiral
- Commands: HMS Westminster; HMS Trenchant
- Awards: Companion of the Order of the Bath

Rear Admiral Hugh Dominic Beard, CB (born 28 December 1967) is a senior Royal Navy officer. He served as Third Sea Lord from 2018 to 2020, and as Assistant Chief of the Defence Staff (Capability & Force Design) from 2020 to 2022.

== Early life and education ==
Beard was born on 28 December 1967 in Birmingham, England. He was educated at St Anselm's Catholic School, a comprehensive school in Canterbury, Kent. He graduated with a Master of Arts degree in defence studies from King's College London in 2003.

== Naval career ==
Beard joined the Royal Navy in 1987, aged 19. He served as executive officer of HMS Vengeance from 1999 to 2002. He became commanding office of the submarine HMS Trenchant in 2005, submarine scheduler at Navy Command in 2008, and Commander Submarine Sea Training in 2010. He went on to be commanding officer of the frigate HMS Westminster in 2012, and Assistant Chief of the Naval Staff (Capability) in November 2018. He served as Assistant Chief of the Defence Staff (Capability & Force Design) from January 2020 until late 2022. He retired from the navy on 27 December 2022.

Beard was appointed Companion of the Order of the Bath (CB) in the 2022 New Year Honours.

Military offices
Preceded by Robert Magowan	Controller of the Navy; 2018–2020	Succeeded by Andrew Burns
