= Richard Cheadle =

Royal Navy Rear Admiral (born 1950)

Rear Admiral Richard Cheadle CB DL
- Born: 27 January 1950 (age 76)
- Military career
- Allegiance: United Kingdom
- Branch: Royal Navy
- Rank: Rear Admiral
- Commands: HM Naval Base Devonport
- Awards: Companion of the Order of the Bath

Rear Admiral Richard Frank Cheadle, CB, DL (born 27 January 1950) is a former Royal Navy officer who went on to be Controller of the Navy.

== Naval career ==
Cheadle served as director of nuclear propulsion at the Ministry of Defence and then as commander of HM Naval Base Devonport. Promoted to rear admiral, he was appointed chief of staff to the Second Sea Lord and Commander-in-Chief, Naval Home Command in 2003. He was appointed Controller of the Navy as well as an executive director of the Defence Procurement Agency in December 2003. By the following year he was still Controller of the Navy but also director, land & maritime. He retired from the navy in 2006 and became a director at WS Atkins.

== Post-naval career ==
Cheadle is a Deputy Lord Lieutenant of Devon. Cheadle is also a councillor for the Buckland Monachorum ward of West Devon Borough Council. Cheadle sits as an independent.

Military offices
Preceded by Nigel Guild	Controller of the Navy; 2003–2006	Succeeded by Andrew Mathews
