= George Leitch (civil servant) =

Sir George Leitch, KCB, OBE (5 June 1915 – 16 March 2010) was an English civil servant. Educated at King's College, Newcastle (part of Durham University), he taught mathematics for two years before serving in the Army during the Second World War, working in operational research and ending his service with the rank of Brigadier as a deputy scientific adviser in the War Office. Demobilised in 1946, he entered the Ministry of Supply the next year. He then worked in the War Office and the Ministry of Defence, where he was promoted to deputy secretary in 1965. Moving to the Ministry's Procurement Executive in 1971, he served as its Second Permanent Secretary from 1972 to 1974 and then Permanent Secretary and Chief Executive from 1974 to 1975. After retiring, he was chairman of board of the aerospace manufacturer Short Brothers from 1976 to 1983.
