= St Anselm's Catholic School =

St Anselm’s Catholic School
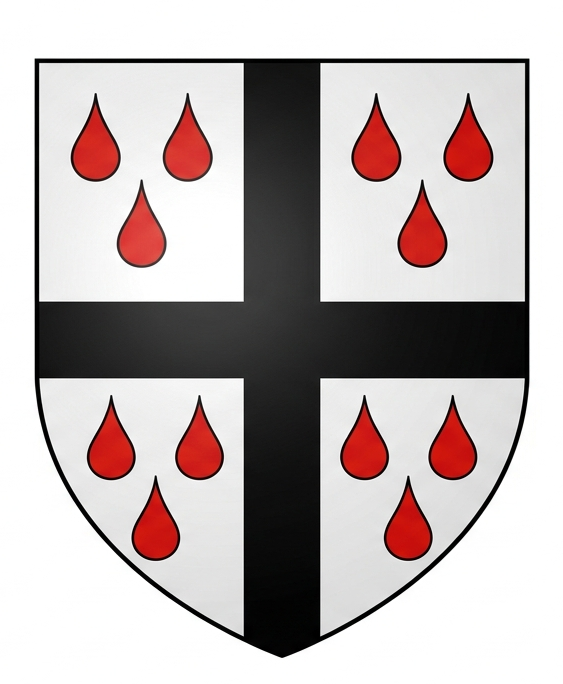

Location
- Old Dover Road Canterbury CT1 3EN England; Canterbury, Kent, CT1 3EN; England; 51°15′47″N 1°06′00″E

Information
- Type: Academy
- Motto: Fides Quaerens Intellectum (Latin: "Faith Seeking Understanding")
- Religious affiliation: Roman Catholic
- Established: 1964
- Local authority: Kent
- Department for Education URN: 140874 Tables
- Ofsted: Reports
- Head teacher: J Rowarth
- Gender: Coeducational
- Age: 11 to 18
- Enrolment: 1097
- Houses: Aquinas; Bosco; Merici; Stein
- Colour
- Website: http://www.st-anselms.org.uk/

St. Anselm's Catholic School is a co-educational (11–18) Catholic comprehensive school, founded in 1964 by the Archdiocese of Southwark. It occupies a rural site on the fringes of Canterbury, bordered by orchards and farmland. The school currently has 1,080 students, of whom 150 are in the sixth form. In September 2004, St. Anselm's was designated as a specialist Science College, and in May 2015 the school converted to academy status.

== Toponymy ==
The school is named after the Philosopher & Archbishop of Canterbury, St Anselm (1033–1109). The main building of the school, named after Sir Thomas More, is the highest point in Canterbury. Each building is named after a local saint, for instance Dunstan, Edmund and Augustine, and a block is named after the famous Archbishop and martyr, Thomas Becket. More Block is the oldest part of the school, with later additions including Becket Block, and Canterbury Block.

== Notable former pupils ==
- Hugh Beard (b. 1967) - Royal Navy officer
