= Emma Walmsley =

British businesswoman

Dame Emma Walmsley DBE
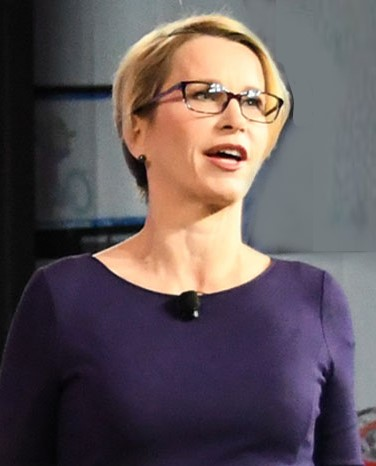
- Walmsley in 2020
- Born: Emma Natasha Walmsley; June 1969 (age 57); Barrow-in-Furness, Lancashire (now Cumbria), England
- Education: University of Oxford
- Title: CEO, GSK plc
- Term: April 2017 – December 2025
- Predecessor: Sir Andrew Witty
- Successor: Luke Miels
- Board member of: GSK plc; Microsoft
- Spouse: David Owen
- Children: 4
- Parent: Vice-Admiral Sir Robert Walmsley

Dame Emma Natasha Walmsley DBE (born June 1969) is a British business executive, who was the chief executive of GSK (formerly GlaxoSmithKline) from April 2017 until 31 December 2025. Before GSK, she worked for L'Oréal for 17 years, and was a non-executive director of Diageo until September 2016. Walmsley is also a non-executive director of Microsoft. She is due to become chief executive of HP Inc. on 4 January 2027.

== Early life ==
Walmsley was born in June 1969 in Barrow-in-Furness in Lancashire (now Cumbria), the daughter of Vice-Admiral Sir Robert Walmsley and Lady (Christina V.) Walmsley (née Melvill). She boarded at St Swithun's School, Winchester, and has an MA in Classics and Modern Languages from Oxford University, where she was at Christ Church.

== Career ==
Walmsley worked at L'Oréal for 17 years where she held a variety of general management and marketing roles in Paris, London and New York, including General Manager of Garnier-Maybelline. In 2007 she moved to Shanghai as General Manager, Consumer Products for L'Oreal China, where she ran the company's Chinese consumer products business, overseeing global brands including L'Oréal Paris, Maybelline and Garnier, as well as Mininurse, a Chinese skincare brand. At the time of her move to GSK in 2010, Advertising Age quoted company insiders surprised at her departure from L'Oreal, where she had been tipped for one of the most senior global management roles.

She joined GlaxoSmithKline in May 2010 as President of Consumer Healthcare Europe, rising in October 2011 to head its global consumer healthcare division as President of Consumer Healthcare Worldwide and a member of the executive team. In March 2015 she became the chief executive officer of Consumer Healthcare. Walmsley was particularly involved in leading the company's sales drive in emerging markets. Under her leadership the consumer products division, one of the world's largest consumer health groups with brands including Panadol, Voltaren and Horlicks, made up nearly a quarter of GlaxoSmithKline's revenues.

She was a non-executive director of Diageo from January to September 2016.

She took over as chief executive of the company in April 2017, making her the first woman to run a major pharmaceutical company. At the time, analysts commented that Walmsley's appointment could be seen as a signal that GSK would keep its consumer operation as a core part of its business.

In August 2017, Walmsley stated that her priority was for GlaxoSmithKline to become more adept at developing and commercialising new drugs. She announced a narrowed set of priorities for drug development, setting a target of allocating 80% of pharma R&D capital to a maximum of four disease areas. However, industry analysts noted that GlaxoSmithKline's decisions to hold its dividend would restrict the amount of cash available for R&D and acquiring intellectual property from other companies. Walmsley has made changes, including "the transformation of the leadership team within R&D."

In January 2018, it was reported that Walmsley had replaced 50 of GlaxoSmithKline's top managers across the company's businesses, and created a number of new roles, including hiring Karenann Terrell from Walmart as chief digital and technology officer.

In September 2019, Walmsley joined the Microsoft board as an independent director.

Walmsley was appointed Dame Commander of the Order of the British Empire (DBE) in the 2020 Birthday Honours for services to the pharmaceutical industry and business.

In 2023, Walmsley received £12.7 million in total pay, a 51 per cent increase from her compensation in 2022, making her the second highest paid chief executive of a European pharmaceutical company.

In September 2025, it was announced that Walmsley will step down as chief executive of GSK at the beginning of 2026.

In November 2026, HP Inc. announced that Walmsley would become its chief executive officer on 4 January 2027.

== Leadership style ==
A Financial Times profile of Walmsley in September 2016 reported that colleagues describe her as a "strong and dynamic" leader who mixes a personable style with a "steely" focus. She inspires those around her with her work ethic. “She sets clear objectives and there's lots of KPIs [key performance indicators] to measure delivery," said one. She is renowned for her combination of empathy and attention to performance, paying close attention to talent development whilst being "ruthless with underperformers".

== Personal life ==
Outside work, Walmsley enjoys yoga. She married David Owen in September 1995 in Greenwich, London, and they have four children.

== Honours ==
In 2023, Walmsley ranked 7th in Fortune Magazine's list of "100 Most Powerful Women". In 2019, she ranked 2nd in Fortune Magazine's list of the 'Most Powerful International Women' in business, having topped the list in 2018. In 2017 she was placed second on the same list.

In 2023, Walmsley ranked 15th in Forbes list of "World's 100 most powerful women".

In 2024, following her success in 2019, Walmsley was again named as Britain's Most Admired Leader in the Britain's Most Admired Companies Study.

In 2026, Walmsley received an honorary degree from her alma mater, the University of Oxford, in their annual Encaenia ceremony.

Business positions
Preceded by Andrew Witty	Chief Executive Officer of GSK plc 2017–2025	Succeeded by Luke Miels
