= Robert Walmsley (Royal Navy officer) =

Royal Navy Vice Admiral (1941–2022)

Vice Admiral Sir Robert Walmsley KCB FREng FRSA FIET
- Born: 1 February 1941; Aberdeen, Scotland
- Died: 4 August 2022 (aged 81); Cape Cod, Massachusetts, U.S.
- Spouses: Christina Melvill (m. 1967; div. 2009); Alexandra Ashbourne (m. 2009)
- Children: 3, including Emma
- Relatives: Robert Walmsley (father)
- Military career
- Allegiance: United Kingdom
- Branch: Royal Navy
- Service years: 1958–1996
- Rank: Vice Admiral
- Awards: Knight Commander of the Order of the Bath

Sir Robert Walmsley (1 February 1941 – 4 August 2022) was a senior officer of the Royal Navy who served as Chief of Defence Procurement at the UK Ministry of Defence from 1996 to 2003.

== Early career ==
Robert Walmsley was born in Aberdeen, Scotland, on 1 February 1941, a son of the anatomist Robert Walmsley and Dr Isabel Mary Walmsley. He was educated at Fettes College in Edinburgh. He joined the Royal Navy as a Dartmouth Cadet in 1958, and went on to study Mechanical Sciences at Queens' College, Cambridge, before taking up a range of seagoing appointments, mainly in submarines, developing an expertise in nuclear propulsion. During his naval career he was at times Chairman of the Naval Nuclear Technical Safety Panel and Director General, Submarines. For three years, he was the Assistant Chief of the Defence Staff for Communications, Command, Control and Information Systems. His final naval appointment (in 1994) was as Controller of the Navy and member of the Navy Board as a vice admiral. He was appointed a Knight Commander of the Order of the Bath in the 1995 Birthday Honours.

Walmsley was a Cambridge Blue, having coxed the light blue boat to victory in the 108th Oxford and Cambridge Boat Race in 1962. He was a Fellow of the Royal Academy of Engineering, the Royal Society of Arts, and the Institution of Engineering and Technology (IET), and was an Honorary DSc of Cranfield University.

== Chief of Defence Procurement ==
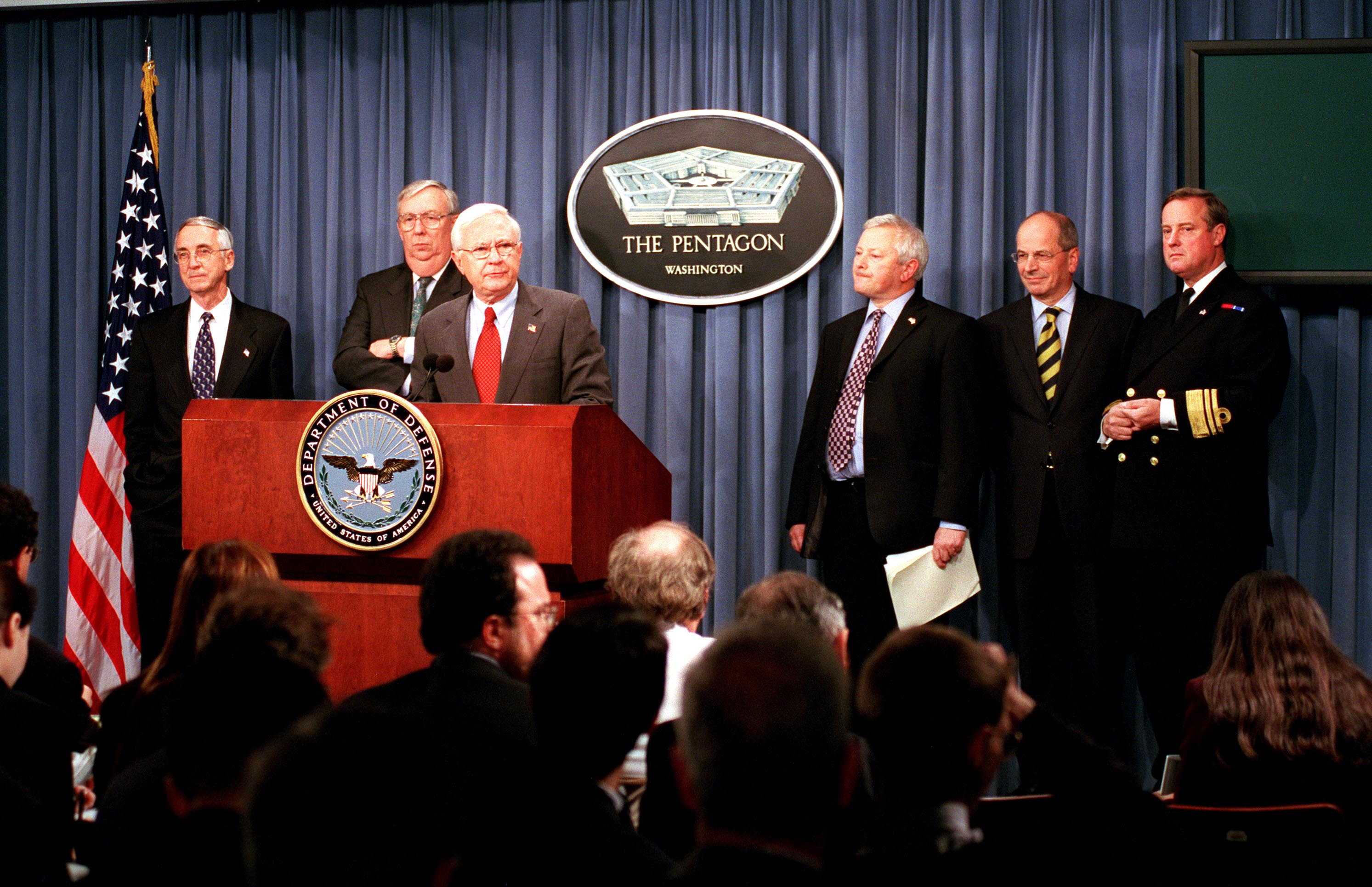
Walmsley (2nd from right) at The Pentagon in 2001

After retiring from the navy, Walmsley held the position of Chief of Defence Procurement at the UK Ministry of Defence from 1996 until his retirement on 30 April 2003. He retired from Her Majesty's Civil Service after serving longer in the Defence Procurement post than any of his predecessors. During Walmsley's period in post he led the transformation of the procurement organisation into the Defence Procurement Agency (DPA, now Defence Equipment and Support) and made numerous appearances as a witness to Parliamentary select committees.

== Personal life and death ==
Walmsley was married twice. He married his first wife, Christina Melvill, in 1967. The couple had one son and two daughters. Daughter, Emma Walmsley, was chief executive of the global pharmaceutical company Glaxo Smithkline.

HMS Sutherland was launched by Christina, Lady Walmsley in 1996. This launch made naval history since Lady Walmsley broke with tradition and used a bottle of Macallan whisky; up until this time Royal Navy ships had always been launched with a bottle of champagne.

Walmsley's first marriage was dissolved in 2009 and later that year he married his second wife Alexandra Ashbourne, who later stood as a candidate in the 2026 election for the position of Chancellor of the University of St Andrews.

On 4 August 2022, at the age of 81, Walmsley died suddenly following an accidental fall down a staircase at a house in Cape Cod, Massachusetts, while vacationing.

== Corporate roles ==
- Chairman of the Board of the Major Projects Association
- Non-executive director of Cohort plc
- Non-executive director of General Dynamics Corporation
- Non-executive director of Ultra Electronics Holdings
- Senior advisor at Morgan Stanley International plc
- Former Director of EDO Corporation (now ITT Exelis) and chairman of the board of EDO (UK) plc
- Former non-executive director of British Energy Group plc
- Former non-executive director of Stratos Global Corporation (now Inmarsat)
- Senior adviser to Fluor Corporation
- Non-executive director of Ultra Electronics

Military offices
Preceded by Sir Kenneth Eaton	Controller of the Navy; 1994–1996	Succeeded by Frederick Scourse (Acting)
