= Chief of Staff Navy Command (HQ) =

Royal Navy, United Kingdom

Office of the Chief of Staff Navy Command (HQ)
- Ensign of the Royal Navy
- Ministry of Defence
- Member of: Navy Command
- Reports to: Second Sea Lord
- Nominator: First Sea Lord
- Appointer: Prime Minister; Subject to formal approval by the King-in-Council
- Term length: Not fixed (typically 1–3 years)
- Inaugural holder: Rear-Admiral Duncan Potts
- Formation: June 2010-current

The Chief of Staff Navy Command (HQ) is a senior Royal Navy appointment is the principal staff officer responsible for coordinating the supporting staff of Navy Command Headquarters, Portsmouth, England. The office was established in June 2010.

== History ==
The post was established following the appointment of Vice-Admiral, Richard J. Ibbotson in June 2010 it continued to be a three-star rank position until the appointment of Rear-Admiral Duncan Potts in April 2013 when it was downgraded to a Two-star rank position. The office holder is the principal staff officer at Navy Command Headquarters. Portsmouth, England responsible for coordinating the HQ staff branches. The office has been held by both Royal Navy and Royal Marines officers. As the Chief of Staff NCHQ, he coordinates and integrates the work of the HQ.

From June 2010 until April 2013 the post holder jointly held the title Deputy Commander-in-Chief, the Fleet. From April 2013 until November 2018 the post holder simultaneously held the title Assistant Chief of the Naval Staff (Capability).

== Chiefs of Staff Navy Command (HQ) ==
Included:

1. Vice-Admiral, Richard J. Ibbotson, 30 June 2010 – September 2011
2. Vice-Admiral George Zambellas. 30 September 2011–September 2012
3. Vice-Admiral, Phillip Jones, September 2012–April 2013
4. Rear-Admiral Duncan Potts, April 2013–September 2014
5. Rear-Admiral James Morse, September 2014–May 2016
6. Rear-Admiral Paul Bennett, May 2016–November 2017
7. Major-General Robert Magowan, RM. November 2017–November 2018
8. Commodore Paul S. Beattie, November 2018–February 2020
9. Brigadier Michael J. Tanner RM February 2020 – June 2022
10. Brigadier Neil Sutherland RM June 2022 – present

== Sources ==
1. Government, HM (2018). "Navy Directory 2017 Containing Lists of Ships, Establishments and Officers of the Fleet" (PDF). www.royalnavy.mod.uk. Ministry of Defence United Kingdom.
2. Mackie, Colin (2019). "Royal Navy - Current Senior Serving Officers" (PDF). www.gulabin.com. C. Mackie.
3. Mackie, Colin (2019). "Royal Navy Senior Appointments" (PDF). gulabin.com. C. Mackie.
4. Maslin, Elaine (2018). "Subsea Defense: Extending Unmanned Capabilities". Marine Technology News
