= Andrew Mathews (Royal Navy officer) =

Vice Admiral Sir Andrew Matthews KCB FREng
- Born: 27 June 1958 (age 68); Stanford le Hope, Essex
- Military career
- Allegiance: United Kingdom
- Branch: Royal Navy
- Rank: Vice Admiral
- Commands: HM Naval Base Devonport
- Awards: Knight Commander of the Order of the Bath

Vice Admiral Sir Andrew David Hugh Mathews KCB FREng (born 27 June 1958) is a senior Royal Navy officer who was Chief of Materiél (Fleet), Royal Navy.

== Naval career ==
Mathews served as commander of HM Naval Base Devonport. Promoted to rear admiral, Mathews was appointed Director-General Nuclear and Controller of the Navy in 2006. He went on to be Director-General Submarines in 2007 and then, following promotion to vice admiral, Mathews was appointed Chief of Materiel (Fleet) and Chief of Fleet Support in 2009, a post he stood down from in December 2013.

Having been appointed a Companion of the Order of the Bath (CB) in the 2008 New Year Honours, Mathews was promoted to Knight Commander of the Order of the Bath (KCB) in the 2013 New Year Honours.

Military offices
Preceded by Richard Cheadle	Controller of the Navy; 2006–2007	Succeeded by Paul Lambert
Preceded by Trevor Soar	Chief of Materiel Fleet; 2009-2013	Succeeded by Simon Lister
