= David Cardwell (civil servant) =

Sir David Cardwell, KCB (27 November 1920 – 19 June 1982) was a British civil servant and government scientist. Educated at the University of London he entered the Royal Aircraft Establishment in 1942. He became Chief Scientist (Army) in 1976. From 1978 to 1980, he was director of the Atomic Weapons Research Establishment. From 1980 to his death in 1982, he was Chief of Defence Procurement at the Ministry of Defence.,
