= Simon Lister (Royal Navy officer) =

Royal Navy Vice Admiral (born 1959)

Vice Admiral Sir Simon Lister KCB OBE
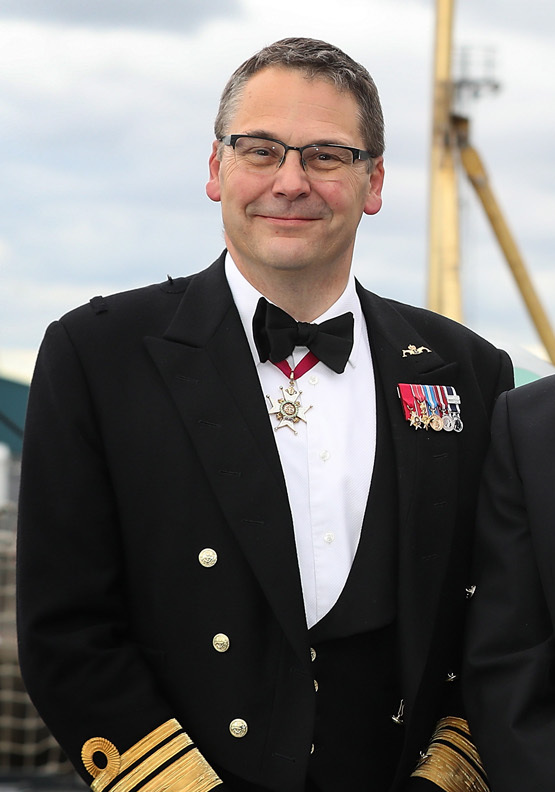
- Vice Admiral Lister in 2017
- Born: October 1959 (age 67); Luton, Bedfordshire, England
- Military career
- Allegiance: United Kingdom
- Branch: Royal Navy
- Service years: 1978–2019
- Rank: Vice Admiral
- Commands: HM Naval Base Plymouth
- Awards: Knight Commander of the Order of the Bath; Officer of the Order of the British Empire

Vice Admiral Sir Simon Robert Lister, KCB, OBE (born October 1959) is a retired Royal Navy officer who is managing director of BAE Systems's naval ships business.

== Naval career ==
Lister joined the Royal Navy in 1978. After training at the Royal Naval Engineering College at Manadon and the Royal Naval College, Greenwich, he became the marine engineer officer of the submarine Odin in 1986. He went on to be marine engineer officer of Torbay and then Trenchant in 1993. He became Naval Assistant to the Chief Executive of the Ship Support Agency in 1994 and, after attending the London Business School in 1996, he became Director, Naval Plans at the Ministry of Defence in 1997 and then naval attaché in Moscow in 2001.

Lister became head of the team responsible for phase one of the internal restructuring programme at the Defence Logistics Organisation in 2004. He went on to be Commander, HM Naval Base Devonport in 2005, Senior Naval Member on the Directing Staff at the Royal College of Defence Studies in April 2008 and Director, Submarines in 2009. Lister became Chief of Materiel (Fleet) and Chief of Fleet Support with promotion to the rank of vice admiral in December 2013. In May 2017, he was appointed as interim head of the Submarine Delivery Agency (SDA) and given the title of Chief of Materiel (Submarines).

Lister was appointed Officer of the Order of the British Empire (OBE) in the 2001 Birthday Honours, Companion of the Order of the Bath (CB) in the 2013 New Year Honours, and Knight Commander of the Order of the Bath (KCB) in the 2017 Birthday Honours.

In August 2017 Lister took a sabbatical from his Royal Navy Career to lead the Aircraft Carrier Alliance. He retired from active service of the navy on 25 October 2019.

== Later career ==
Following his retirement from the Royal Navy, Lister went on to become managing director of BAE Systems's naval ships business. In November 2021, he was additionally reappointed as a non-executive director on the board of the Office for Nuclear Regulation; he will continue in that role until March 2026. Since April 2022, he has been a member of the Scottish Government's National Strategy for Economic Transformation Delivery Board.

Military offices
Preceded by Andrew Mathews	Chief of Materiel Fleet/Chief of Fleet Support; 2013–2017	Succeeded by N/A
