= Richard Saunders Dundas =

British Royal Navy officer (1802–1861)

Vice-Admiral Sir Richard Saunders Dundas KCB
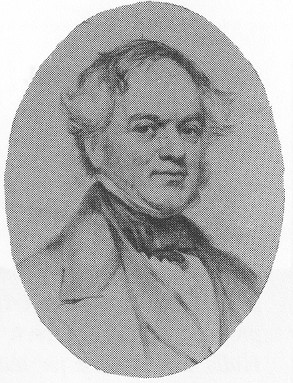
- Vice-Admiral Sir Richard Dundas
- Born: Richard Saunders Dundas; 11 April 1802; England
- Died: 3 June 1861 (aged 59); London, England
- Military career
- Allegiance: United Kingdom
- Branch: Royal Navy
- Service years: 1817–1861
- Rank: Vice-Admiral
- Commands: HMS Sparrowhawk; HMS Volage; HMS Warspite; HMS Belvidera; HMS Melville; HMS Powerful; Baltic Fleet
- Conflicts: First Opium War; Crimean War
- Awards: Knight Commander of the Order of the Bath

Vice-Admiral Sir Richard Saunders Dundas, KCB (11 April 1802 – 3 June 1861) was a Royal Navy officer. As a captain, he took part in the capture of the Bogue forts in January 1841, during the First Opium War. He was appointed to the command of the Fleet in the Baltic Sea, in succession to Sir Charles Napier, in February 1855 and led the naval support during the latter stages of the Crimean War, enforcing a strict blockade and carrying out the bombardment of Sveaborg in August 1855. He was appointed First Naval Lord in the first Palmerston ministry in November 1857 and then, after stepping down to be Second Naval Lord during the second Derby–Disraeli ministry, he stepped up again to become First Naval Lord in the second Palmerston ministry in June 1859, remaining in office until his death. The prime minister (Viscount Palmerston) described Dundas as "a most distinguished officer".

== Early career ==
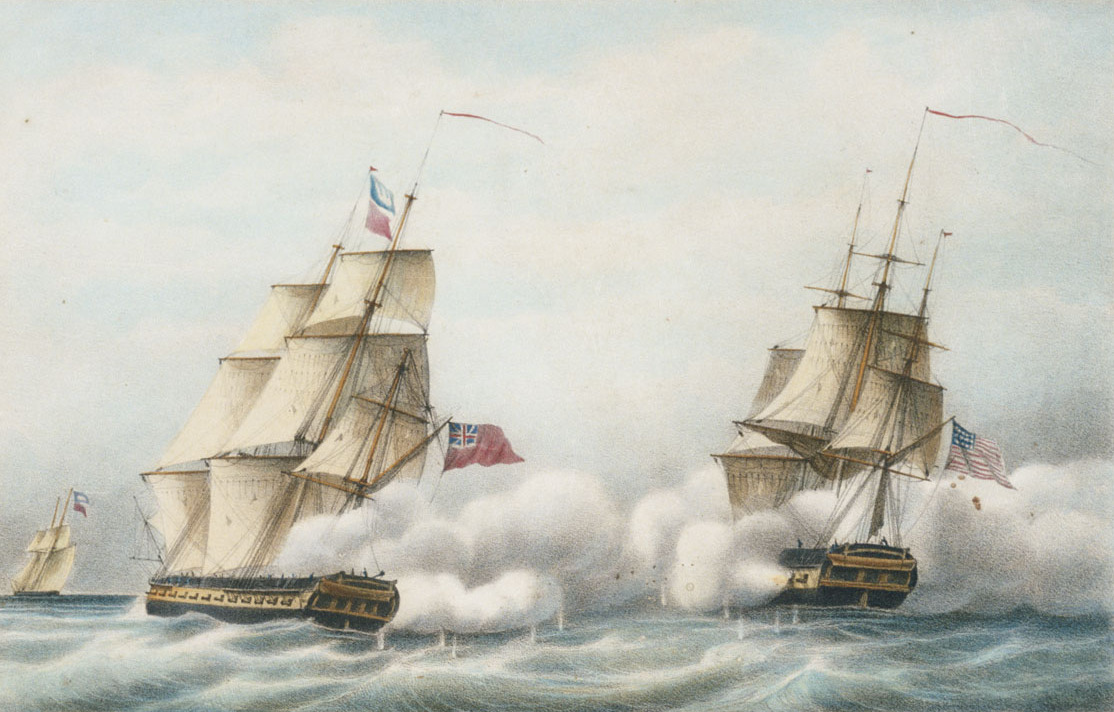
The fifth-rate HMS Belvidera (left) which Dundas commanded

The son of Robert Dundas, 2nd Viscount Melville and his wife Anne (née Huck-Saunders), Dundas was educated at Harrow School and joined the Royal Navy in 1817. After initial training at the Royal Navy College at Portsmouth, he joined the frigate HMS Ganymede in the Mediterranean Fleet. Promoted to lieutenant on 16 June 1821 and to commander on 23 June 1823, he was given command of the sloop HMS Sparrowhawk on the North America and West Indies Station in June 1823.

Promoted to captain on 17 July 1824, Dundas took command of the sixth-rate HMS Volage on the North America and West Indies Station in September 1825 and then of the third-rate HMS Warspite on the East Indies Station in December 1826. He became secretary to his father, who was serving a second term as First Lord of the Admiralty, in 1828. He went on to take command of the fifth-rate HMS Belvidera in the Mediterranean Fleet in November 1830 and the third-rate HMS Melville, flagship of the East Indies Station, in September 1837. In HMS Melville he took part in the capture of the Bogue forts in January 1841 during the First Opium War. He was appointed a Companion of the Order of the Bath on 29 June 1841.

Dundas returned to the Admiralty as secretary to Lord Haddington, First Lord of the Admiralty, in January 1845 and became captain of the second-rate HMS Powerful in the Mediterranean Fleet in January 1848.

== Senior command ==
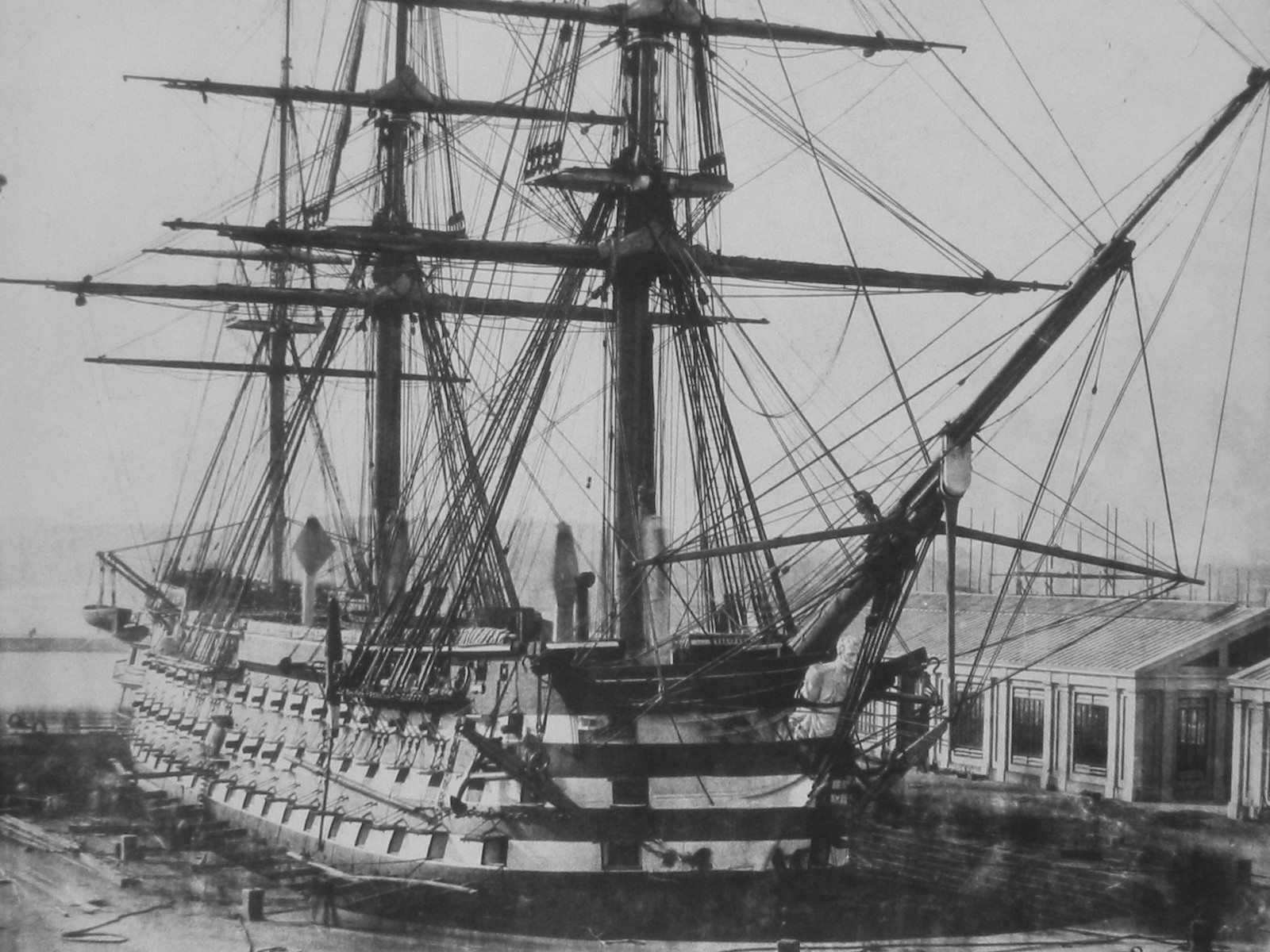
HMS Duke of Wellington, Flagship of the Baltic Fleet, which Dundas commanded during the Crimean War

Promoted to rear-admiral on 4 July 1853, Dundas was appointed Third Naval Lord in the Aberdeen ministry in January 1853 and then Second Naval Lord in the same ministry in June 1854. He was appointed to the command of the Baltic Fleet in the Baltic Sea, hoisting his flag in the first-rate HMS Duke of Wellington, in succession to James Dundas in February 1855. Dundas led the naval support during the latter stages of the Crimean War enforcing a strict blockade in the Baltic. Dundas was hesitant but the French admiral Charles Penaud persuaded him to attack the Russian fleet in the harbour of Sveaborg on 9–10 August 1855. The British provided most of the attacking force. Much of the bombardment was done with smaller vessels that the shore batteries found hard to hit. Six Russian ships of the line and 17 smaller warships were destroyed, and the Russians suffered 2,000 casualties. The allies suffered one death, 15 wounded, and damage to only one British sloop.

Dundas was advanced to Knight Commander of the Order of the Bath on 5 February 1856 and became Second-in-command of the Mediterranean Fleet, hoisting his flag in HMS Duke of Wellington, in April 1856. He was also appointed a Grand Officer of the French Legion of Honour on 2 August 1856.

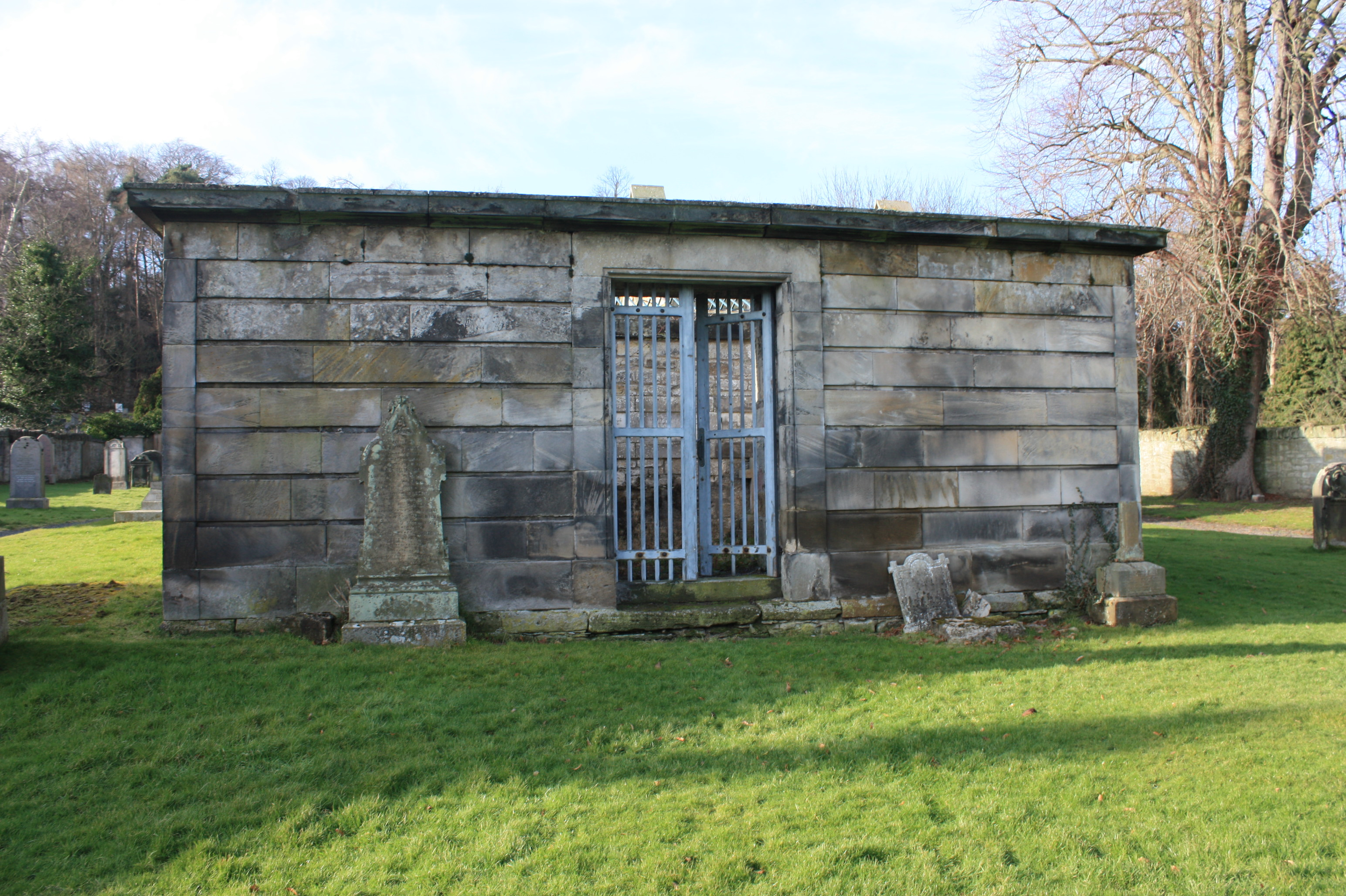
The Dundas Vault in old Lasswade Kirkyard, containing the first five Viscounts Melville

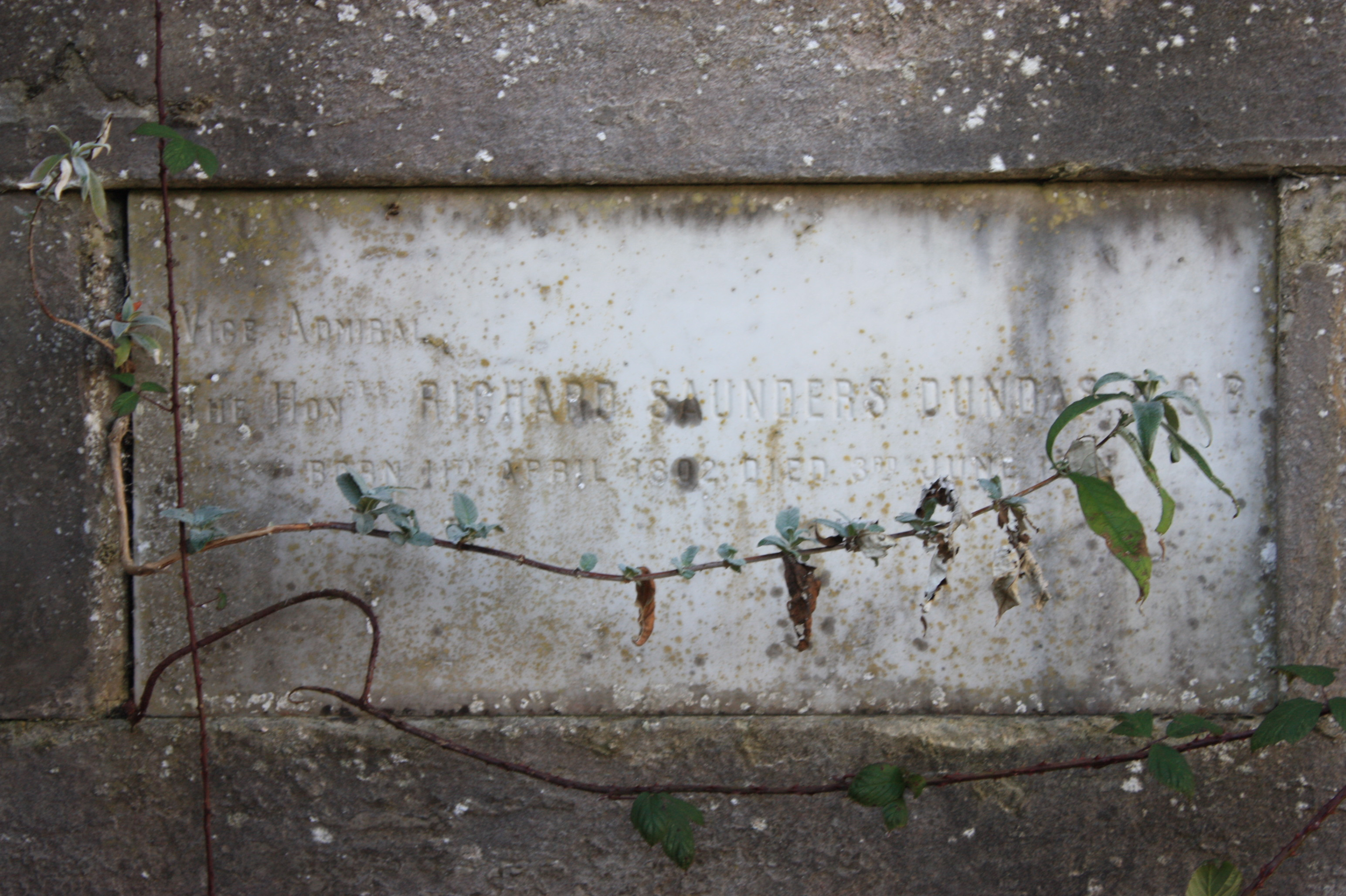
The simple grave of Vice Admiral Richard Saunders Dundas, in the Dundas Vault, Old Lasswade Kirkyard

Dundas was appointed Second Naval Lord in the First Palmerston ministry in April 1857 and then First Naval Lord in the same ministry in November 1857. Promoted to vice-admiral on 24 February 1858, Dundas stepped down to be Second Naval Lord in the Second Derby ministry in March 1858. He stepped up again to become First Naval Lord in the Second Palmerston ministry in June 1859 remaining in office until his death. He died, unmarried, of a heart attack at Spring Gardens in London on 3 June 1861. Later that day, the prime minister (Viscount Palmerston) described Vice Admiral Dundas as:

"a most distinguished officer, who was for forty-five years in the service of his country, and who equally distinguished himself in every sphere in which he was called upon to act. He was eminent for the good discipline and order of the ships which he commanded, he was distinguished by the gallantry and good judgment with which he conducted every naval operation in which he was engaged, he was most valuable as a public servant in the direction of naval affairs at the Admiralty. Whether at the Council Board or on the quarter deck his merits were equally eminent, and his services were equally valuable to the country."

His body was returned to the family home, and he is buried beside his father and grandfather in the Dundas Vault in Old Lasswade Kirkyard, close to Melville Castle.

== See also ==
- O'Byrne, William Richard (1849). "Dundas, Richard Saunders" . A Naval Biographical Dictionary . John Murray – via Wikisource.

== Sources ==
- William Loney RN Career History
- Sondhaus, Lawrence (12 October 2012), Naval Warfare, 1815–1914, Routledge, ISBN 978-1-134-60994-9
- Sondhaus, Lawrence (11 June 2014), Navies of Europe, Routledge, ISBN 978-1-317-86978-8

Military offices
| Preceded by Sir Thomas Herbert | Third Naval Lord; January 1853 – June 1854 | Succeeded by Sir Peter Richards |
| Preceded by Sir Maurice Berkeley | Second Naval Lord; June 1854 – February 1855 | Succeeded by Henry Eden |
| Preceded by Henry Eden | Second Naval Lord; April 1857 – November 1857 | Succeeded by Henry Eden |
| Preceded by Sir Maurice Berkeley | First Naval Lord; November 1857 – March 1858 | Succeeded by Sir William Martin |
| Preceded by Henry Eden | Second Naval Lord; March 1858 – June 1859 | Succeeded by Frederick Pelham |
| Preceded by Sir William Martin | First Naval Lord; June 1859 – June 1861 | Succeeded by Sir Frederick Grey |
