= Paul Beattie (Royal Navy officer) =

Royal Navy Vice Admiral

Vice Admiral Paul Beattie CBE
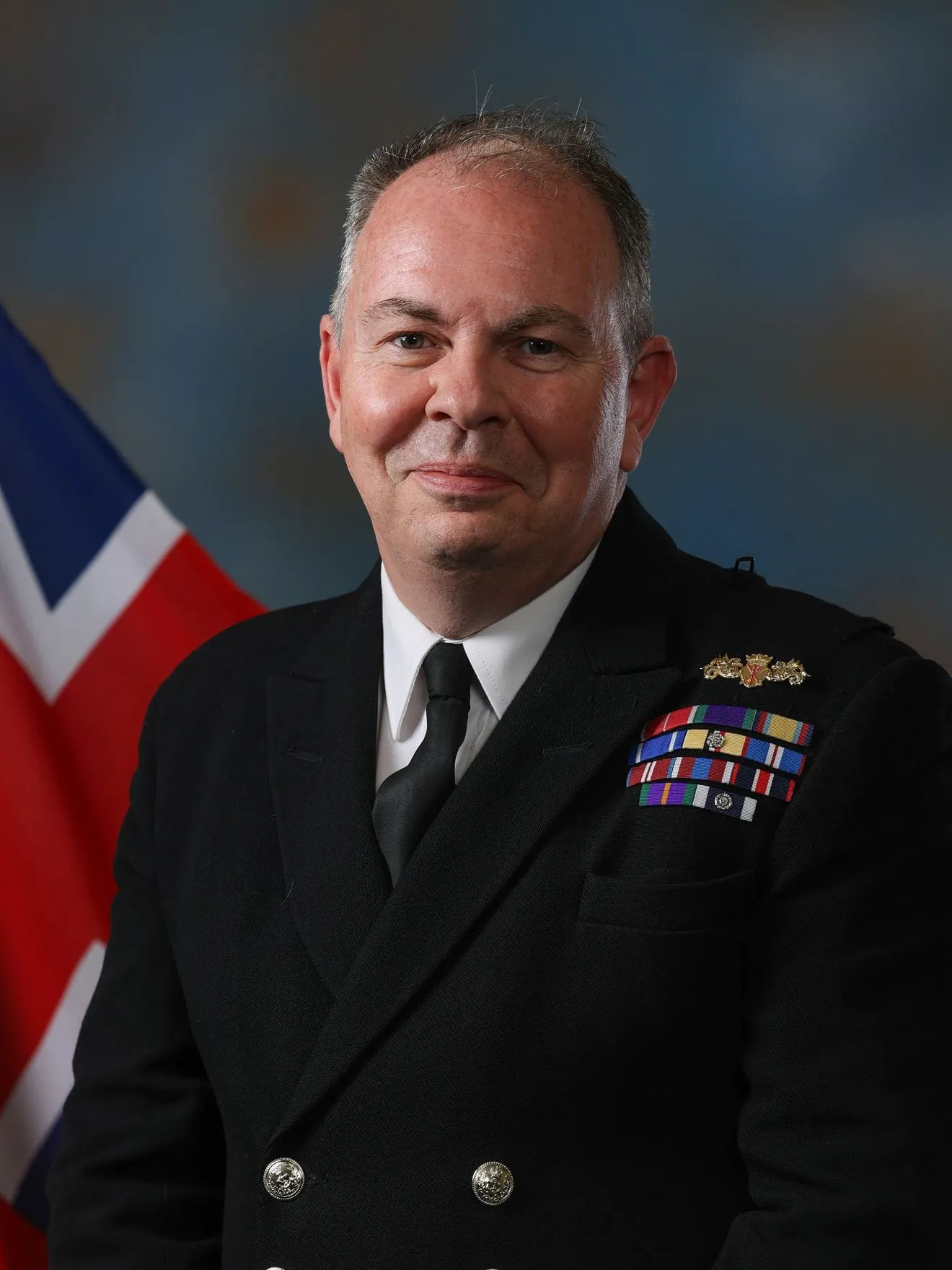
- Vice Admiral Beattie
- Military career
- Allegiance: United Kingdom
- Branch: Royal Navy
- Service years: 1989–present
- Rank: Vice Admiral
- Commands: HMS Arun; HMS Manchester; Second Sea Lord
- Awards: Commander of the Order of the British Empire

Vice Admiral Paul S. Beattie, CBE is a senior Royal Navy officer, serving as Second Sea Lord and Deputy Chief of Naval Staff since 2025.

== Naval career ==
Beattie joined the Royal Navy in 1989. He went on to command the minesweeper, HMS Arun, and later the destroyer, HMS Manchester.

He was appointed Chief of Staff, Navy Command in November 2018 and Commodore, Naval Staff in February 2020.

He was transferred to the retired list in August 2024 before being recalled as Second Sea Lord in September 2025.

Beattie was appointed a Commander of the Order of the British Empire in the 2024 Birthday Honours.

Military offices
Preceded by Sir Martin Connell	Second Sea Lord and Deputy Chief of the Naval Staff; 2025–present	Incumbent
