= Kenneth Eaton =

Royal Navy Admiral (1934–2022)

Admiral Sir Kenneth Eaton GBE KCB FREng
- Born: 12 August 1934; Plymouth, England
- Died: 20 July 2022 (aged 87); Warnford, Hampshire, England
- Military career
- Allegiance: United Kingdom
- Branch: Royal Navy
- Service years: 1957–1994
- Rank: Admiral
- Commands: Controller of the Navy; HMNB Portsmouth
- Awards: Knight Grand Cross of the Order of the British Empire; Knight Commander of the Order of the Bath

Admiral Sir Kenneth John Eaton GBE KCB FREng (12 August 1934 – 20 July 2022) was a British Royal Navy officer who served as Controller of the Navy from 1989 to 1994, as well as President of the Society for Nautical Research from 2020 to 2022.

== Early life ==
Born in Plymouth, England on 12 August 1934, the son of John and May, Eaton was educated initially at Sheerness Dockyard School where he undertook apprenticeship as an electrician. He later attended Borden Grammar School and Fitzwilliam College, Cambridge where he secured a BA in Mechanical Sciences Tripos.

== Naval career ==
Eaton joined the Royal Navy in 1953, as a Special Entry Cadet (Electrical Branch) and was confirmed as a sub-lieutenant in 1957. Trained as a weapons engineer, he served on the aircraft carrier HMS Victorious from 1959 to 1961 and then worked at the Admiralty Surface Weapons Establishment from 1961 to 1965. He then served on the aircraft carrier HMS Eagle, at the shore establishment HMS Collingwood and the destroyer HMS Bristol from 1965 to 1971. He then worked on the Defence Communications Network from 1971 to 1972 and then returned to the Admiralty Surface Weapons Establishment where he remained until joining the aircraft carrier HMS Ark Royal in 1976. Promoted to captain, he was posted to the Ministry of Defence in 1978.

He was appointed assistant director of Communications Planning in 1979, assistant director of Command Systems in 1981, Director of Torpedoes in 1983 and Director-General of Underwater Weapons for the Navy in 1985. Promoted to rear-admiral on 3 November 1987, he went on to become Flag Officer, Portsmouth and Commander of HM Naval Base Portsmouth in 1987 and, with promotion to vice-admiral, he became Controller of the Navy in 1989. He was promoted to full admiral in 1993 and retired on 3 August 1994.

Eaton was appointed a Knight Commander of the Order of the Bath in the 1990 Birthday Honours and advanced to Knight Grand Cross of the Order of the British Empire in the 1994 New Year Honours.

== Later life ==
In retirement Eaton served as Chairman of Guy's & St Thomas' NHS Trust from 1995 to 1999, the United Kingdom Atomic Energy Authority from 1996 to 2002 and the Mary Rose Trust from 2001 to 2007. He was also Rear-Admiral of the United Kingdom from 2001 to 2007. Eaton was a member of the Society for Nautical Research from 1986, then served as a council member in 2010, chairman in 2011 and finally became President in 2020, a post he remained in until his death.

As well as more prominent Chairmanships, Eaton was also involved with local affairs, chairing the Warnford Village Meeting and the Winchester Science Centre & Planetarium, as well as supporting local opera societies the Wessex Glyndebourne Association, West Green Opera and Grange Festival Opera.

In 2004, Eaton was awarded an Honorary Doctor of Sciences Degree from Aston University.

== Personal life and death ==
In 1959, Eaton married Sheena Buttle; they had two sons and a daughter. Eaton died at home on 20 July 2022, at the age of 87, after a short illness. He was buried at The Church of Our Lady of Warnford on 17 August 2022. Lady Eaton died in 2026.

Military offices
Preceded by Sir Derek Reffell	Controller of the Navy; 1989–1994	Succeeded by Sir Robert Walmsley
Honorary titles
Preceded by Sir Jeremy Black	Rear-Admiral of the United Kingdom; 2001–2007	Succeeded by Gordon Messenger
