= Henry Eden =

Royal Navy Admiral (1798–1888)

Admiral Henry Eden
- Born: 1798
- Died: 30 January 1888 (aged 89–90)
- Military career
- Allegiance: United Kingdom
- Branch: Royal Navy
- Service years: 1811 – 1870
- Rank: Admiral
- Commands: HMS Conway; HMS Impregnable; HMS Caledonia

Admiral Henry Eden (1798 – 30 January 1888) was a senior British Royal Navy officer who went on to be Second Naval Lord.

== Naval career ==
He was born the fourth son of Thomas Eden of Wimbledon, Surrey, the Deputy-Auditor of Greenwich Hospital. Eden joined the Royal Navy in 1811. He was given command of the sixth-rate HMS Conway in 1832, the second-rate HMS Impregnable in 1839 and the first-rate HMS Caledonia in 1840. His last seagoing command was HMS Collingwood from which he was invalided home in 1844.

In 1846 he was made private secretary to Lord Auckland, First Lord of the Admiralty. In 1848 he was appointed Commodore-Superintendent of Woolwich Dockyard, before being promoted to serve temporarily as Admiral-Superintendent of Devonport Dockyard in 1854.

He became Second Naval Lord in March 1855 and Third Naval Lord in April 1857 before moving back up to Second Naval Lord again in November 1857 and leaving the Admiralty in March 1858.

== Family ==
In 1849 he married Elizabeth Harriet Georgiana Beresford, daughter of Lord George Beresford. They lived at Gillingham Hall in Norfolk but had no children.

Military offices
Preceded by Sir Richard Dundas	Second Naval Lord; March 1855 – April 1857	Succeeded by Sir Richard Dundas
Preceded by Sir Peter Richards	Third Naval Lord; April 1857–November 1857	Succeeded by Sir Alexander Milne
Preceded by Sir Richard Dundas	Second Naval Lord; November 1857 – March 1858	Succeeded by Sir Richard Dundas
