= Assistant Chief of the Naval Staff (Capability) =

Office of the Assistant Chief of the Naval Staff (Capability)
- Ensign of the Royal Navy
- Ministry of Defence
- Member of: Navy Command
- Reports to: Second Sea Lord
- Nominator: First Sea Lord
- Appointer: Prime Minister; Subject to formal approval by the Queen-in-Council
- Term length: Not fixed (typically 1–3 years)
- Inaugural holder: Rear-Admiral Duncan Potts
- Formation: 2013-current

The Assistant Chief of the Naval Staff (Capability) is a senior Royal Navy appointment responsible he is accountable for planning and delivering the larger part of future maritime effectiveness; he does this on behalf of the First Sea Lord.

== History ==
The post was created in 2013 the office holder currently chairs the maritime capability board which is accountable for planning and delivering the larger part of future maritime effectiveness he does this on behalf of the First Sea Lord and Chief of Naval Staff. In addition, he liaises with the Finance Director (Navy), Assistant Chief of Naval Staff (Support), Assistant Chief of the Naval Staff (Aviation & Carriers), and Ministry of Defence, Head Office Director of Strategic Projects to deliver a Command Plan that meets the Ministry of Defence Outputs. The office holder is superintended by the Second Sea Lord and Deputy Chief of the Naval Staff.

From April 2013 until November 2018 the post holder simultaneously held the title Chief of Staff Navy Command (HQ). The post is also known as Director Develop as of September 2020.

== Assistant Chief of Naval Staff (Capability) ==
Have included:

- Rear-Admiral Duncan Potts (April 2013 – September 2014)
- Rear-Admiral James Morse (September 2014 – May 2016)
- Rear-Admiral Paul Bennett (23 May 2016 – November 2017)
- Major General Robert Magowan (November 2017– November 2018)
- Rear-Admiral Hugh Beard (November 2018 – January 2020)
- Rear-Admiral Andrew Burns (January 2020 – September 2021)
- Rear-Admiral James Parkin (September 2021 – present)

== Sources ==
1. Civil Service Year Book (2018) "Ministry of Defence (MoD) Navy Command".United Kingdom Ministers, Departments and Executive Agencies (54th ed.). London, England: Dandy Booksellers Ltd. ISBN 9781787320345.
2. Government, HM (2018). "Transparency data Navy Command senior, as of April 2017 Updated 30 April 2018". gov.uk. Ministry of Defence UK. Retrieved 11 January 2019.
3. Mackie, Colin (2018). "Royal Navy Senior Appointments" (PDF). gulabin.com. C. Mackie. Retrieved 11 January 2019.
