= Robert Magowan =

Royal Marines General

General Sir Robert Magowan KCB CBE
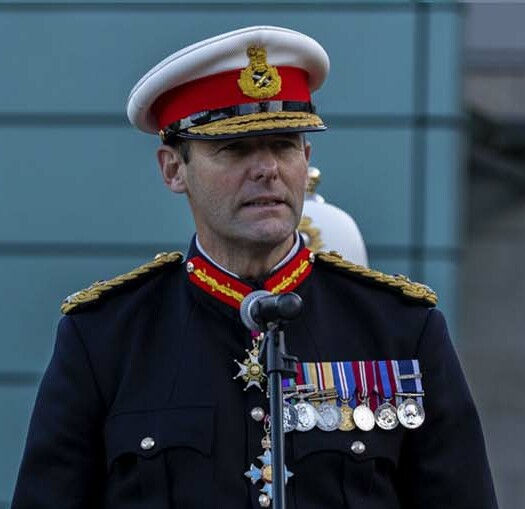
- Magowan in 2022
- Born: 12 September 1967 (age 58)
- Allegiance: United Kingdom
- Branch: Royal Marines
- Service years: 1989–present
- Rank: General
- Commands: Controller of the Navy; Commandant General Royal Marines; 30 Commando Information Exploitation Group; Deputy Commander UK Strategic Command
- Conflicts: Operation Banner; Iraq War; Operation Atalanta; War in Afghanistan
- Awards: Knight Commander of the Order of the Bath; Commander of the Order of the British Empire; Commander of the Legion of Merit (United States)
- Alma mater: University of Southampton
- Spouse: Charlotte Magowan
- Children: 2 daughters

General Sir Robert Andrew Magowan, KCB, CBE (born 12 September 1967) is a senior Royal Marines officer who has served as Commander Cyber & Specialist Operations Command since March 2026. He previously served as the Deputy Chief of the Defence Staff (Financial and Military Capability) (later renamed Deputy Chief the Defence Staff, Force Development) from May 2022 until August 2025. He also previously served as Commandant General Royal Marines from 2016 to 2017 and again from 2021 to 2022.

== Early life and education ==
Magowan was educated at Queen Elizabeth's Grammar School, Faversham and the University of Southampton.

== Military career ==
Magowan was commissioned into the Royal Marines in 1989. He became Plans Officer at Headquarters 3rd Mechanised Division in 2001, in which role he was deployed to Afghanistan, and then became second-in-command of 42 Commando with which he took part in the 2003 invasion of Iraq. He joined the Cabinet Office Assessment Staff in 2003, was appointed a Member of the Order of the British Empire in the 2005 New Year Honours, and posted to the Afghan Drugs Inter-departmental Unit in 2005, before becoming commanding officer of 30 Commando Information Exploitation Group in 2006. He commanded IX Battle Group in Afghanistan in 2007.

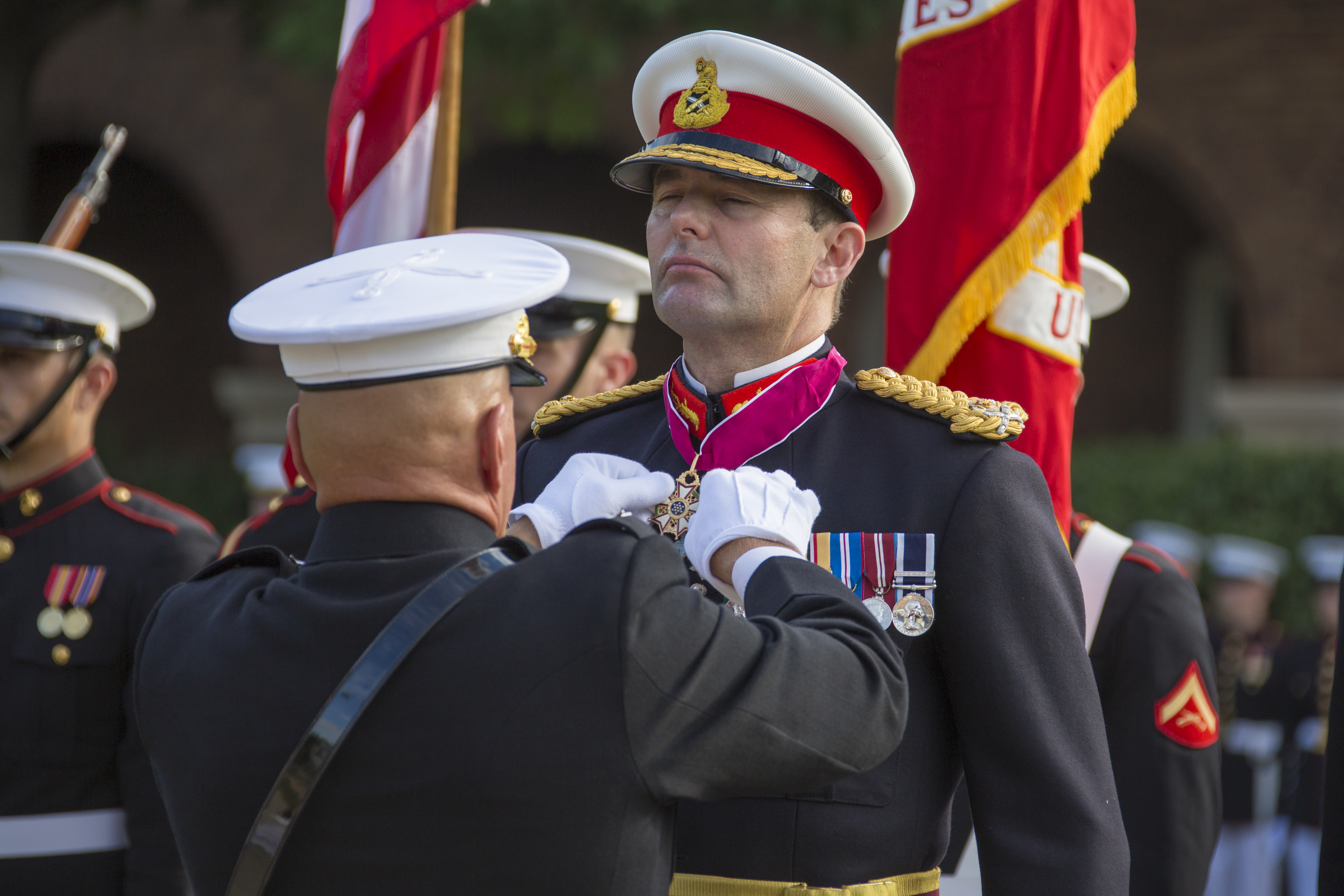
Magowan receiving the US Legion of Merit from General Robert B. Neller.

Magowan became a Deputy Head in Defence Intelligence in 2009 and Chief of Staff to the National Contingent Commander at the headquarters of the International Security Assistance Force in Kabul in 2012, for which he was appointed a Commander of the Order of the British Empire in the October 2013 Operational Honours. The award recognised "his outstanding contribution in strengthening bonds between British forces and the Afghans". He was appointed as the Royal Navy's Commodore, Naval Personnel Strategy in March 2013, Commandant General Royal Marines in June 2016, and commander of Operation Atalanta in June as well.

Magowan was awarded the United States Commander of the Legion of Merit by General Robert Neller on 10 October 2017. The following month, he was appointed Assistant Chief of Naval Staff (Capability) and Controller of the Navy, before becoming Assistant Chief of the Defence Staff (Capability and Force Design) in December 2018. He was appointed a Companion of the Order of the Bath in the 2018 Birthday Honours. He became Deputy Commander Joint Forces Command, renamed as Strategic Command in January 2020. Magowan was promoted to lieutenant general on 22 January 2020. In April 2021, he was once more appointed as Commandant General Royal Marines, becoming the first person to hold the position twice, along with being the first person to serve in the position as a lieutenant general since 1996. He became Deputy Chief of the Defence Staff (Financial and Military Capability) in May 2022, the position was renamed as Deputy Chief of Defence Staff (Force Development) in early 2025. He stepped down in August 2025, and was succeeded as Deputy Chief of Defence Staff by Air Marshal Tim Jones.

Magowan was appointed Knight Commander of the Order of the Bath (KCB) in the 2024 New Year Honours.

Magowan became General Officer Commanding Cyber & Specialist Operations Command in March 2026.

== Personal life ==
Magowan is married to Charlotte and together they have two daughters. He is an accomplished mountaineer, a keen reader of European political history and an amateur cook.

Military offices
Preceded by Martin Smith	Commandant General Royal Marines; 2016–2017	Succeeded by Charles Stickland
Preceded by Paul Bennett	Controller of the Navy; 2017–2018	Succeeded by Hugh Beard
Preceded by	Deputy Commander UK Strategic Command; 2020–2022	Succeeded by Tom Copinger-Symes
Preceded by Matthew Holmes	Commandant General Royal Marines; 2021–2022	Succeeded by Gwyn Jenkins
Preceded by Rich Knighton	Deputy Chief of the Defence Staff (Financial and Military Capability); 2022–2025	Succeeded by Tim Jones
Preceded by Sir James Hockenhull	Commander Cyber & Specialist Operations Command; 2026–present	Incumbent
