= Peter Richards (Royal Navy officer) =

Royal Navy Admiral (1787–1869)

Admiral Sir Peter Richards KCB
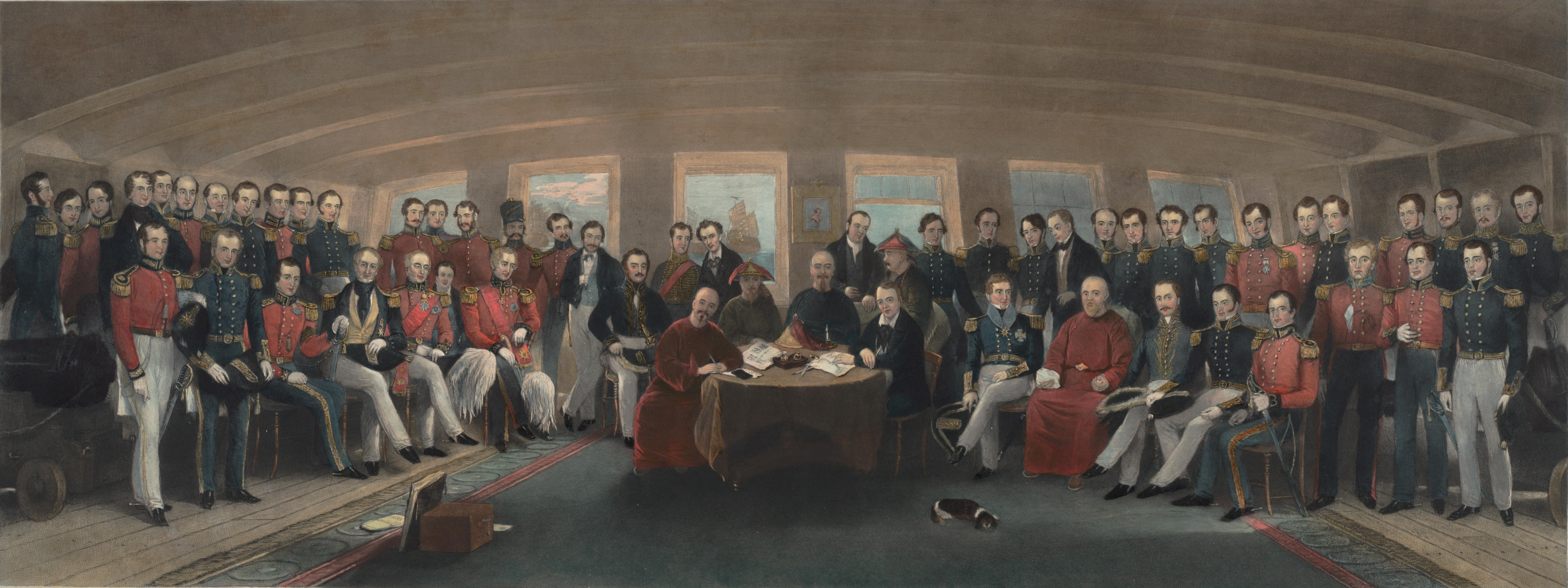
- Signing of the Treaty of Nanking (1842). Richards is seated in the front row (second from right) between Maj. George Malcolm and Lt. Col. Francis Spencer Hawkins.
- Born: 1787
- Died: 16 March 1869 (aged 81–82)
- Military career
- Allegiance: United Kingdom
- Branch: Royal Navy
- Service years: 1798–1865
- Rank: Admiral
- Commands: HMS Asia; HMS Volage; HMS Cornwallis; HMS Hibernia; HMS Royal Sovereign; HMS Cumberland; HMS Boscawen
- Conflicts: First Opium War; Crimean War
- Awards: Knight Commander of the Order of the Bath

Admiral Sir Peter Richards KCB (1787 – 16 March 1869) was a Royal Navy officer who went on to be Third Sea Lord.

== Naval career ==
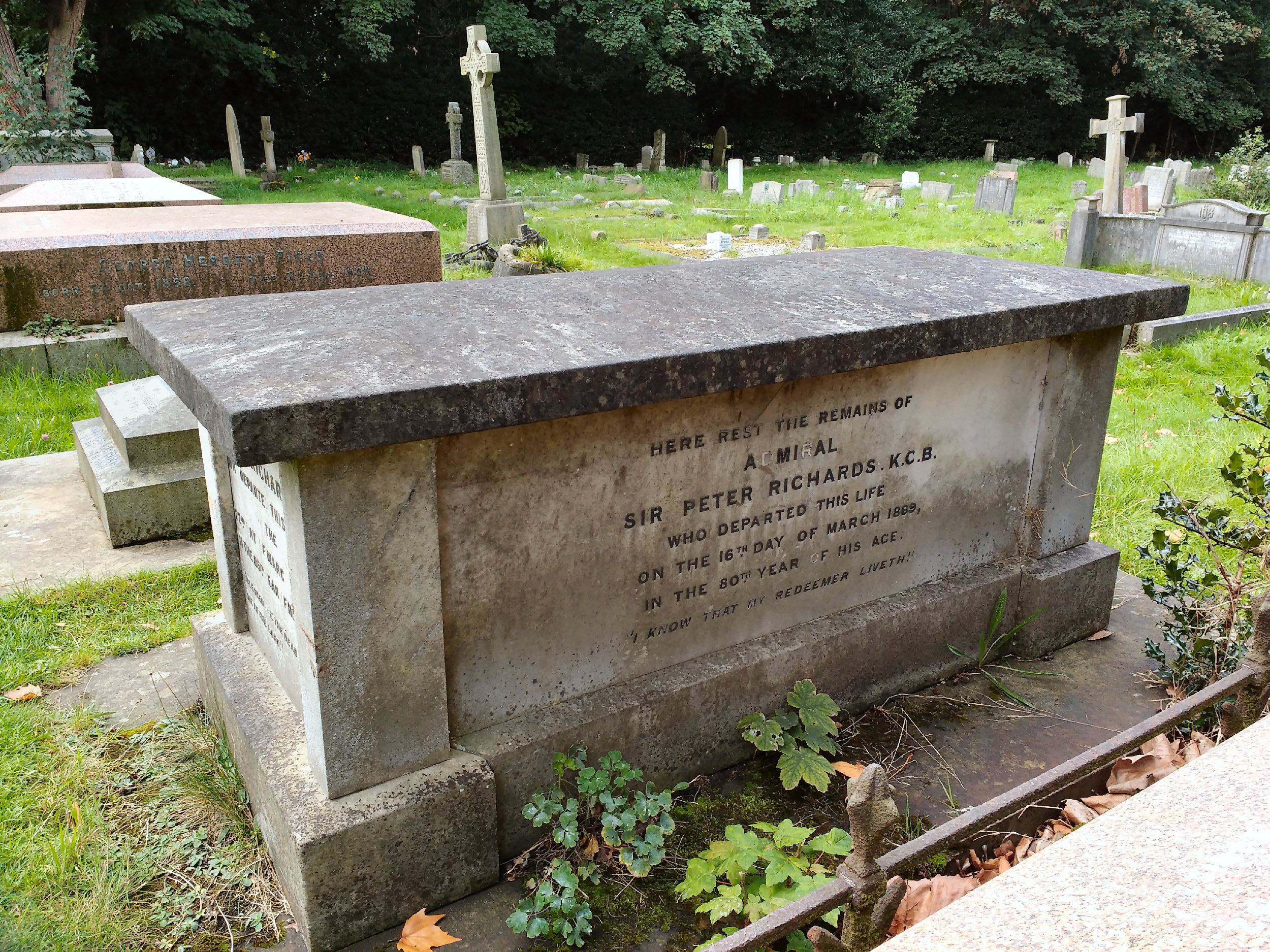
Grave of Sir Peter Richards at St Andrew's Church, Ham

Richards joined the Royal Navy in 1798. Promoted to captain in 1828, Richards was given command of HMS Asia and HMS Volage before commanding HMS Cornwallis in the First Opium War. He later commanded HMS Hibernia, HMS Royal Sovereign, HMS Cumberland and HMS Boscawen.

As a rear-admiral he was appointed Third Sea Lord in 1854 and served in that role during the Crimean War. He was promoted vice-admiral on the Reserved List in April, 1862.

St. Peter's Memorial Mission Chapel at Saltash Passage near St Budeaux in Cornwall was built in his memory but damaged in World War II and then demolished in 1956.

He is buried at St Andrew's Church, Ham, Surrey.

== See also ==
- O'Byrne, William Richard (1849). "Richards, Peter" . A Naval Biographical Dictionary . John Murray – via Wikisource.

Military offices
Preceded by Sir Richard Dundas	Third Sea Lord; 1854–1857	Succeeded by Henry Eden
