= Thomas R. Richards =

US Navy officer (born 1947)

Thomas Russell Richards
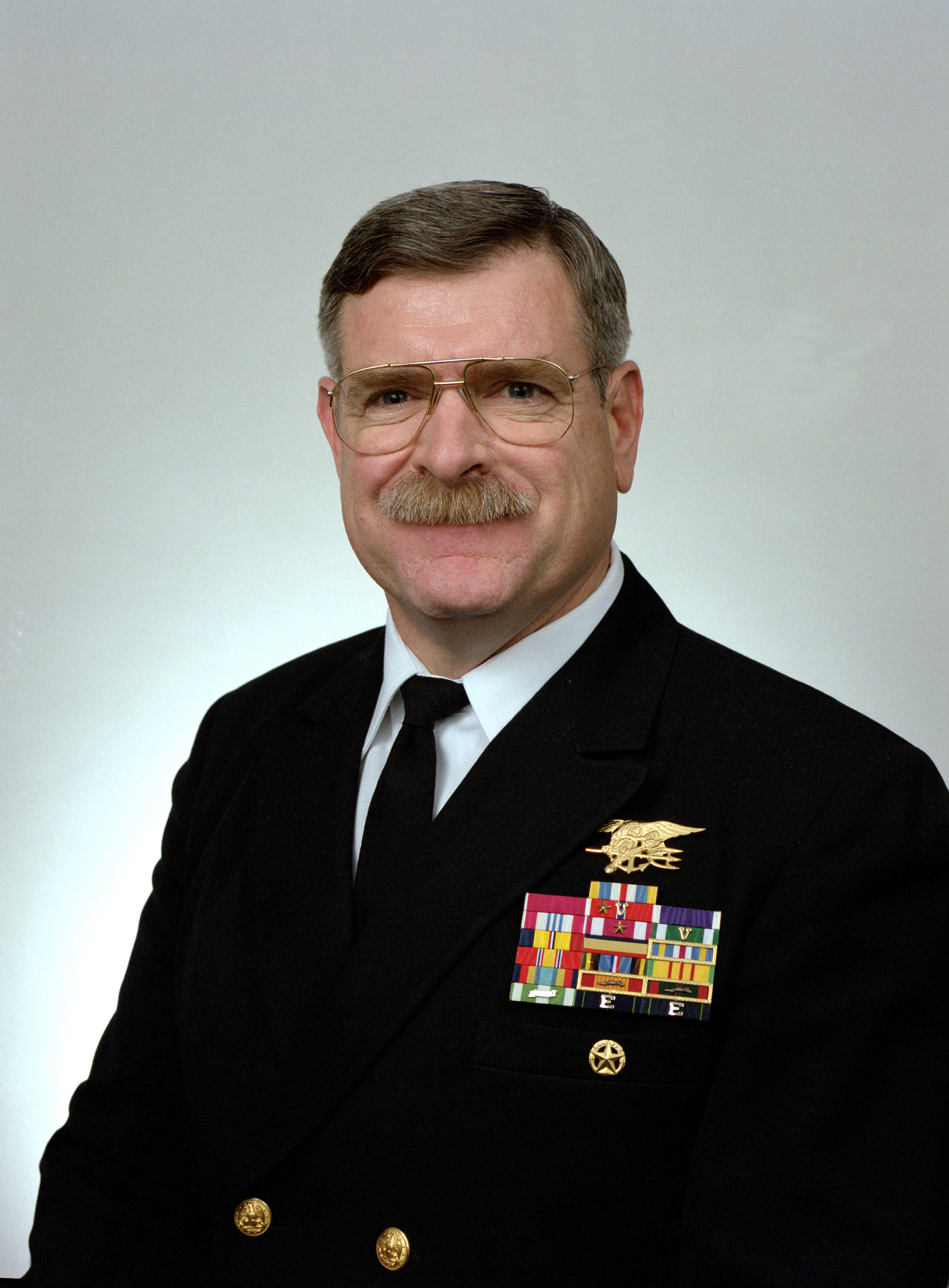
- Born: 1947; Bay Shore, New York, U.S.
- Died: September 20, 2025 (aged 77–78)
- Alma mater: Villanova University
- Military career
- Allegiance: United States
- Branch: United States Navy
- Service years: 1969–1999
- Rank: Rear admiral
- Nickname: Hulk
- Commands: SEAL TEAM ONE; Naval Special Warfare Command
- Conflicts: Vietnam War; El Salvador; Operation Praying Mantis
- Awards: Defense Superior Service Medal; Legion of Merit; Silver Star Medal

Thomas R. Richards (born 1947) was a United States Navy rear admiral who commanded the Naval Special Warfare Command from 1996 to 1999.

== Naval career ==
Thomas Richards graduated from Villanova University in 1969 and was commissioned through the Navy Reserve Officers Training Corps. After his commission as an Ensign in the U.S. Navy, Richards received orders to Basic Underwater Demolition/SEAL training (BUD/S) at Naval Amphibious Base Coronado. After six months of training, Richards graduated BUD/S class 55 in April 1970 and received assignment to SEAL TEAM ONE. Following SEAL Basic Indoctrination (SBI) training and platoon training, Richards deployed to South Vietnam with Zulu Platoon from August 1970 to February 1971. He was wounded in February 1971 at the end of his tour and was awarded the Bronze Star Medal and Purple Heart. Richards led naval special operations forces during Operation Prime Chance and Operation Praying Mantis in the Persian Gulf. Richards served in numerous staff and command positions including operations officer NSWG 1; operations officer, SEAL TEAM TWO, executive officer, Underwater Demolition Team Twelve (UDT-12), commanding officer, Special Boat Unit Thirteen; senior U.S. Naval representative at the U.S. Military Group (MILGRU) in El Salvador from 1983 to 1984; commanding officer, SEAL Team ONE from 1986 to 1988; programs officer with the Naval Sea Systems Command in Washington, D.C., and commanding officer, Naval Special Warfare Center. From 1996 to 1999, Richards served as the commanding officer of the Naval Special Warfare Command. He retired from active duty in 1999 after 30 years of service.

This article contains material from the United States Federal Government and is in the public domain.

=== Awards and decorations ===
U.S. military decorations
Navy Distinguished Service Medal
Defense Superior Service Medal
Legion of Merit
Bronze Star with Combat "V" and 5/16 bronze star
Purple Heart
Meritorious Service Medal
Navy and Marine Corps Commendation Medal with Combat "V"
Presidential Unit Citation
Joint Meritorious Unit Award
Combat Action Ribbon
Navy Unit Commendation
U.S. Service (Campaign) Medals and Service and Training Ribbons
National Defense Service Medal
Armed Forces Expeditionary Medal
Vietnam Service Medal
Navy Sea Service Deployment Ribbon
Republic of Vietnam Gallantry Cross Unit Citation Ribbon
Republic of Vietnam Civil Actions Unit Citation Ribbon
Republic of Vietnam Campaign Medal
Navy Rifle Marksmanship Badge
Navy Pistol Marksmanship Badge

U.S. badges, patches and tabs
SEAL Trident
Command at Sea insignia
