= Structure of the Royal Navy =

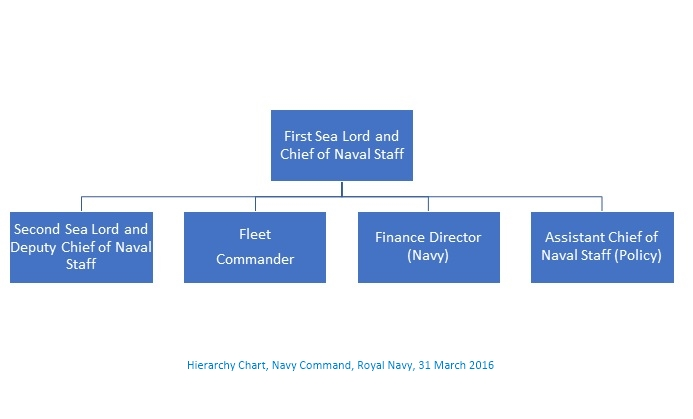
The main hierarchy of the Royal Navy in 2016, as depicted in an organizational chart.

The structure of the Royal Navy is multi-faceted, and has evolved significantly over time. Administratively, the Royal Navy includes the General Service and Submarine Service, the Fleet Air Arm, the Royal Marines, the Maritime Reserves, the Royal Fleet Auxiliary, and the Naval Careers Service. The Queen Alexandra's Royal Naval Nursing Service (QARNNS) officers and ratings also form part of the Royal Navy. The Royal Navy is governed by the Admiralty Board of the Defence Council.

The Maritime Reserves consisted of the Royal Naval Reserve, the Royal Marines Reserve, the Recall Reserve, and Sponsored Reserves, in addition. Previously seagoing reservists also included the Royal Naval Volunteer Reserve (RNVR). An intermediate form of reserve, between the professional RNR and the civilian RNVR, was created as war threatened in 1936. This was the Royal Naval Volunteer (Supplementary) Reserve.

The First Sea Lord and Chief of the Naval Staff is the Royal Navy's professional head and chairman of the Navy Board. He is responsible to the secretary of state for the fighting effectiveness, efficiency and morale of the Naval Service, and supports the Secretary of State for Defence in the management and direction of the Armed Forces.

== History ==
After the British capture of Jamaica in 1655, the Admiral and General-at-Sea who had helped capture the island, William Penn, was appointed as Commander-in-Chief of the English Royal Navy's forces in the area. The Commander-in-Chief at Jamaica became one of the Navy's first overseas commands. During Nelson's time the Royal Navy had numerous fleets and smaller forces worldwide, with each Commander-in-Chief being responsible to the Lords of the Admiralty.

In September 1939 Royal Navy forces abroad and at Home included the Home Fleet; the Commanders-in-Chief at Rosyth; the Nore; Portsmouth; and the Western Approaches, and their commands; the 2nd Cruiser Squadron and its attached destroyers; the Channel Force, including Resolution, Revenge, HMS Courageous, HMS Hermes, and destroyers; the Northern Patrol; the Mediterranean Fleet; and the Commanders-in-Chief, South Atlantic; America and West Indies (at Bermuda); China (Admiral Sir Percy Noble, flying his flag aboard HMS Kent (54) at Hong Kong); East Indies (at Trincomalee); the Rear-Admiral, Gibraltar (Rear-Admiral N.A. Wodehouse) and his forces; and the Reserve Fleet. In addition there was also the Fisheries Protection and Minesweeper Flotilla and the Royal Fleet Auxiliary.

By the late 1940s, after the Second World War, the Royal Navy was divided into a number of afloat commands/fleets and ashore commands, prominent examples being the Home Fleet; Mediterranean Fleet; East Indies Station; and Far East Fleet. It was planned that the last Commander-in-Chief, South Atlantic and South America, was to haul down his flag on 11 April 1967 and to leave Cape Town the following day. C-in-C South Atlantic & South America was abolished/absorbed into the Western Fleet that year, when Western Fleet assumed responsibility for all ships "West of Suez", meaning the disappearance of the Mediterranean Fleet. In the 1970s Western Fleet and Far East Fleet were amalgamated into Commander-in-Chief Fleet. On 31 October 1971, the last day of the validity of the Anglo-Malayan Defence Agreement, the last Commander, Far East Fleet, Rear Admiral Anthony Troup, hauled down his flag. At the same time, the post of Commander-in-Chief, Plymouth was merged with that of Commander-in-Chief, Portsmouth to form Naval Home Command. Bases overseas increasingly disappeared with the retreat from "East of Suez."

=== From the 1990s ===
The purpose-built Headquarters at Whale Island, Portsmouth was opened in 2002 was named after Admiral of the Fleet Sir Henry Leach, the First Sea Lord during the Falklands War. It was housed within HMS Excellent (50°48′53.7″N 1°5′59.1″W).

A Top Level Budget (TLB) was the major financial accounting group of the MOD, seemingly introduced during the 1990s. The Chief of Fleet Support, located in Bath, disappeared as a TLB sometime after 1997/98. The merger of the Commander-in-Chief Fleet and 2nd Sea Lord organisations on 1 April 2006 created a single Naval Top Level Budget - the Fleet TLB. On 1 April 2010 the Fleet TLB was renamed Navy Command.

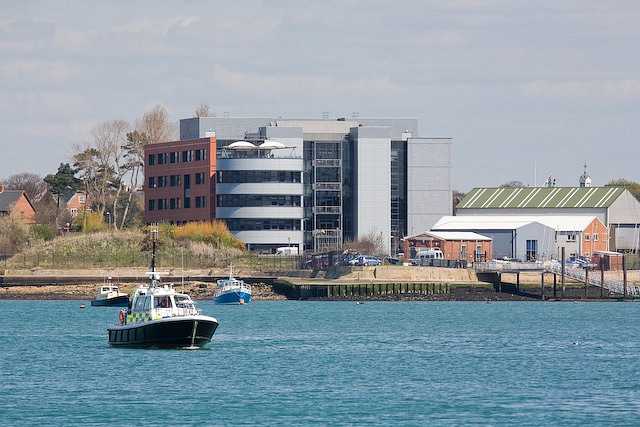
Henry Leach Building, Whale Island

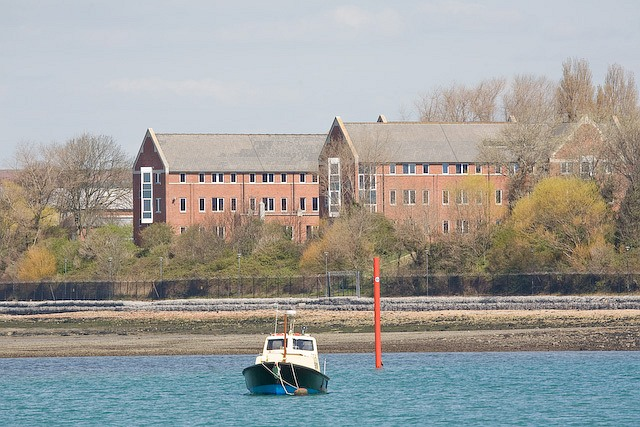
West Battery, Whale Island

As of 2017 official descriptions said that Navy Command Headquarters was based at Whale Island, but also includes the Command Centre in Northwood, and support staff in Portsmouth Naval Base. As of 2017 it included:

- Henry Leach Building and West Battery Building, HMS Excellent, Portsmouth – Senior Naval staff
- Moore Building, HMS Excellent – Fleet Battle Staff.
- Command Centre, Northwood Headquarters – Maritime operations staff
- HMNB Portsmouth – Support Staff
- Maritime Warfare Centre
- Flag Officer Sea Training – training of warships for combat preparatory to deployments
- Royal Navy Chaplaincy Service – provision of religious ministry

Navy Command supported the First Sea Lord in the management of the Command, and delivers the Service's current and future outputs as articulated in the Command Plan. Royal Navy official writings describe Navy Command Headquarters both as a physical site, on Whale Island (at Portsmouth, Hampshire), but Navy Command, also, as a collective formed of the most senior RN officers (2018-2022), and as a TLB.

On 1 April 2025 a Lords announcement appeared to presage the abandonment of the TLB system, saying that under the Secretary of State and Ministers, the MOD's main subdivisions would now include a strengthened Department of State, a fully-fledged Military Strategic Headquarters, plus the National Armaments Director and Defence Nuclear. The Secretary of State for Defence, John Healey, had confirmed on 18 February 2025 that instead of the current 10 budget holders that "there [would] be four new budget holders, one for each of this new quad."

== Structure ==
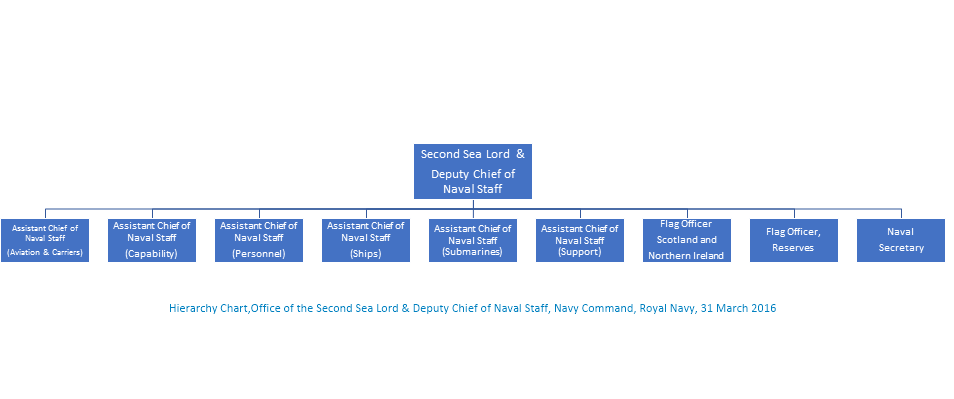
Office of the Second Sea Lord and Deputy Chief of the Naval Staff, Royal Navy, Hierarchy Chart, 31 March 2016

In 2008 the Fleet Commander's role was to exercise Full Command, on behalf of the First Sea Lord, over all Fleet Units, Battle Staffs, the Fleet Air Arm, Royal Fleet Auxiliary and the Royal Marines. He is responsible for the generation of units for tasking, and the operation of the Fleet in meeting standing commitments, conduct of current operations, and maintaining their contingent capability, as directed by Head Office and articulated in the Navy Command Plan. In early 2026 he was described as "the Royal Navy's most senior operational commander, responsible for the operational effectiveness and efficiency of the Fleet."

In 2018, the Second Sea Lord led Navy Command HQ, and was responsible for the Development and Delivery of future and current capability in support of the Fleet Commander, as detailed in the Navy Command Plan.

The previous office of the Assistant Chief of the Naval Staff (Submarines) and Deputy Flag Officer Scotland and Northern Ireland, as of January 2017, was disestablished under the Navy Command Transformation Programme, April 2020.

Changes by 2020–2021 saw the Commander United Kingdom Strike Force take up command of the UKSTRKFOR Enterprise, including the Maritime Battle Staff. The Maritime Battle Staff appears to be a change of name for the previous Fleet Battle Staff. The Fleet Battle Staff, based in two locations (Portsmouth and Plymouth), was the operational planning department, that planned exercises and operations for large multinational naval and marine task groups across the globe. But in actuality the Fleet Battle Staff was merely a collective name for the COMUKMARFOR, COMUKAMPHIBFOR, Commander UK Task Group (COMUKTG), and the 3 Commando Brigade Headquarters.

== Structural Listing 2025 ==
Listing as of 31 December 2025

- First Sea Lord and Chief of the Naval Staff
  - Direct Reports to 1SL/CNS:
    - Deputy Director Afloat Sustainment Programme (RFA)
    - Director Finance and Commercial
      - Deputy Finance Director, Navy
      - Financial Deputy Director, Nuclear
    - Navy DNS Communications Deputy Director
    - Head of ICG (policy issues)
    - Deputy Director Future Support Acquisition (DNF)
    - Deputy Director Navy Capability Strategy (Mr Andrew Mitchell, SCS)
    - Chief Digital and Information Officer
    - Deputy Director Navy Strategic Plans
    - STANAVFORL - OF6
    - Commander Maritime Reserves;
    - RNMCE Ahead Engagement
    - Chief of Staff HQ;
    - Dep Dir C4 ISR N6
    - Dep Dir Policy and Engagement
    - Fleet COS Aviation (OF7)
    - Commodore Naval Legal Services
    - Navy Healthcare
    - Deputy Director Naval Infrastructure
    - CJOS COE Depty Director
    - NATO Defence Engagement
    - Commander JIATF Lazurite
    - SPO Director Norway Strategic Partnership
    - Deputy Director Strategic Engagement
    - MSHQ COS Temp
    - DDPC (Commandant's diary)
    - Secretariat SM
    - MSHQ IAMD Deputy Director
    - Director Navy Digital
    - DM-NG SRO
    - Deputy Director Performance
    - Deputy Director Commercial Shipping Acquisition
    - Senior Responsible Owner Clyde Infrastructure Programme
    - Senior Responsible Owner SM Availability
    - SRO Devonport Infrastructure (Major Change Programme)
    - SRO Future Infrastructure
    - Navy Acquisition - Head MESA AW - Deputy Director
    - Head RN Culture Centre
    - Naval Assistant (People tasks)
    - Head Royal Fleet Auxiliary People Development and Recovery
    - Deputy Director People and Training Strategy
    - Deputy Director People Training / Commandant Training Management Group
      - Collingwood, Raleigh, Sultan, RM CTC
    - Awaiting Assignment & Service Complaints (multiple posts)

=== Fleet Commander ===
- Chaplain of the Fleet
- Head Navy Safety Centre
- National Hydrog & DCE Hydrog
- Commander United Kingdom Strike Force (COMUKSTRKFOR or CSF)
  - Commander United Kingdom Carrier Strike Group
  - Deputy Commander, Comd Strike Force
- Director Force Generation – Responsible for the Royal Navy's Scheduling Authority, In-Service Capability Management, Intelligent Customer function and, discharging legislative Duty Holding Responsibilities/Risk to Life management.
  - Naval Base Commander, Portsmouth
  - Deputy Director Logistics
  - Plans OD Plans
  - Commodore Naval Aviation
  - Commander Fleet Operational Sea Training
  - Commodore Ian Feasey, Commander Surface Flotilla
- Director Submarines
  - CFF (leads Submarine Flotilla)
  - Naval Base Commander, Clyde
  - Naval Base Commander, Drake/Devonport
  - Deputy Director Submarines (Operational Duty Holder)
- Commander Operations
  - Deputy Commander Operations, a Commodore responsible for ensuring the Royal Navy has the ability to observe and process all aspects of operational experience to learn lessons from previous operations and enhance fighting power.
  - PJHQ TF Poseidon Naples (Ukrainian Navy support)

=== Second Sea Lord ===
- Director Navy Acquisition
- Director Develop
- Assistant Chief of the Naval Staff, directs and develops naval strategic policy and strategy for the Royal Navy
