= Chief of Defence Procurement =

The Chief of Defence Procurement was a senior post in the British Ministry of Defence. The post-holder was Chief Executive of the MoD Procurement Executive from 1971 until 1999 and then Chief Executive of the Defence Procurement Agency until 2007. It was open to serving officers as well as civilians.

== Chiefs of Defence Procurement ==
- Sir Derek Rayner (1971–1972)
- Sir Michael Cary, KCB (1972–1974)
- Sir George Leitch, KCB OBE (1974–1975)
- Sir Clifford Cornford, KCB (1975–1980)
- Sir David Cardwell, KCB (1980–1982)
- Air Chief Marshal Sir Douglas Lowe, GCB, DFC, AFC (1982–1983)
- Sir David Perry, KCB (1983–1985)
- Sir Peter Levene, KBE (1985–1991)
- Sir Malcolm McIntosh, KBE, AC (1991–1996)
- Vice Admiral Sir Robert Walmsley, KCB (1996–2003)
- Vice Admiral Sir Peter Spencer, KCB (2003–2007)

The post was subsumed into Defence Equipment and Support on 1 April 2007.
