= Defence Procurement Agency =

Executive Agency of the UK Ministry of Defence

Coordinates: 51.5033°N 2.55917°W

Agency overview
- Formed: 1999
- Preceding agency: MoD Procurement Executive
- Superseding agency: Defence Equipment and Support
- Jurisdiction: United Kingdom
- Headquarters: Bristol, England
- Agency executive: Chief of Defence Procurement
- Parent agency: Ministry of Defence

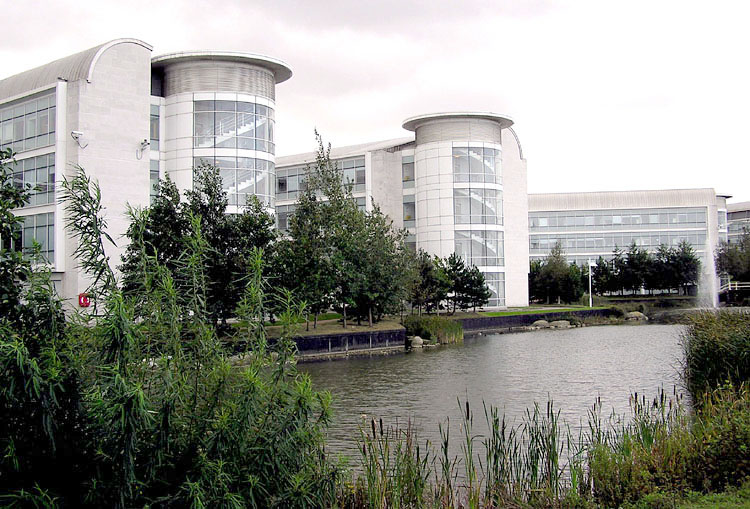
DPA headquarters, Bristol

The Defence Procurement Agency (DPA), was an Executive Agency of the United Kingdom Ministry of Defence responsible for the acquisition of materiel, equipment and services, for the British armed forces.

Led by the Chief of Defence Procurement, the Agency sourced equipment and services from its headquarters in Bristol.

== History ==
The Defence Procurement Agency was established on 1 April 1999, after the announcement in the Strategic Defence Review of a specialised agency to succeed the MoD Procurement Executive. From 1 April 2007 the agency was merged with the Defence Logistics Organisation to form a new organisation called Defence Equipment and Support.
