= MoD Procurement Executive =

Former British defence procurement agency

The MoD Procurement Executive was the acquisition organisation of the Ministry of Defence.

Supply of military aircraft had been the responsibility of the Ministry of Aircraft Production; the Ministry of Supply (disestablished 1959); the Ministry of Technology, and laterly, the Ministry of Aviation Supply, established in 1970. "In 1971 the Government called on Mr Derek Rayner to advise on its relations with the aviation industry. One of his principal recommendations was the transfer to the MOD of the military aviation task to be undertaken by a separate organisation within the MOD, which would also assume the responsibility for all other military procurement."

The Procurement Executive (widely known as PE) was established on 2 August 1971 as a single procurement agency for acquiring equipment for all three services, the Royal Navy, British Army and Royal Air Force, with Derek Rayner (later Lord Rayner) as the first Chief of Defence Procurement.

It was superseded by the Defence Procurement Agency on 1 April 1999.
